= SS United States =

American ocean liner

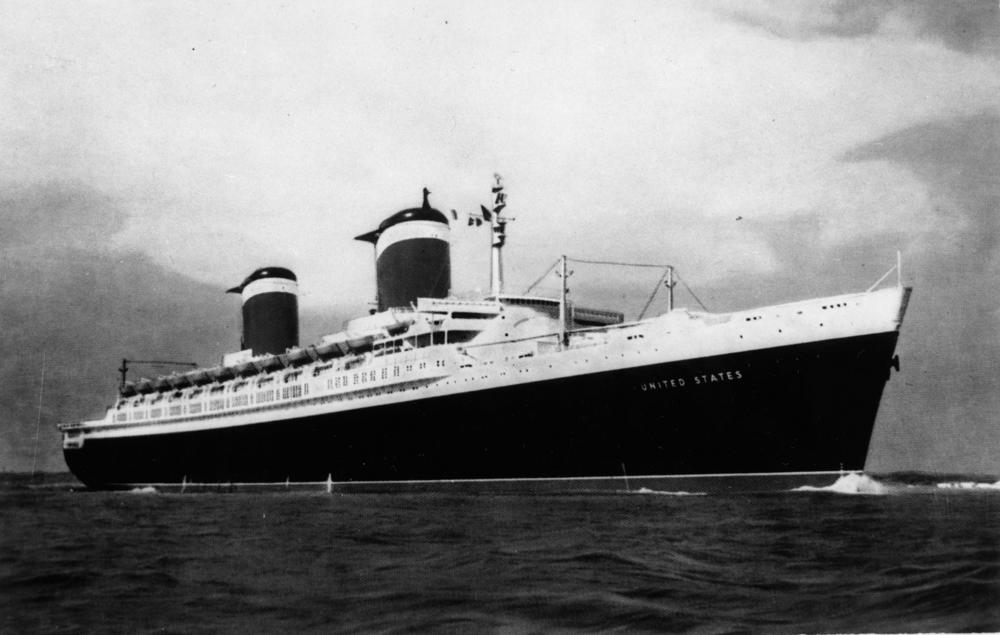
- SS United States at sea in the 1950s

History

United States
- Name: United States
- Namesake: United States
- Owner: 1952–1970: United States Lines; 1970–1980: US Maritime Administration; 1980–1992: Richard Hadley; 1992–1997: Marmara Marine Inc.; 1997–2003: Edward Cantor; 2003–2011: Norwegian Cruise Line; 2011–2024: SS United States Conservancy; 2024–2026: Okaloosa County, Florida
- Operator: United States Lines
- Port of registry: New York City
- Route: 1952: Transatlantic: New York – Le Havre – Southampton (occasionally Bremerhaven); 1961: Cruises
- Ordered: 1949
- Builder: Newport News Shipbuilding and Drydock Company
- Cost: $71.8 million ($713 million in 2025)
- Yard number: Hull 488
- Laid down: February 8, 1950
- Launched: June 23, 1951
- Sponsored by: Lucile Connally
- Christened: June 23, 1951
- Completed: 1952
- Maiden voyage: July 3, 1952
- In service: 1952–1969
- Out of service: November 14, 1969
- Identification: IMO number: 5373476; Callsign KJEH
- Nickname(s): Big U
- Fate: Sunk as artificial reef, November 11, 2026

General characteristics
- Type: Ocean liner
- Tonnage: 53,329 GRT, 29,475 NRT
- Displacement: 45,400 tons (designed); 47,264 tons (maximum)
- Length: 990 ft (302 m) (overall); 940 ft (287 m) (waterline)
- Beam: 101.5 ft (30.9 m) maximum
- Height: 175 ft (53 m) (keel to funnel)
- Draft: 31 ft 3 in (9.53 m) (design); 32 ft 4 in (9.86 m) (maximum)
- Decks: 12
- Installed power: 240,000 shp (180,000 kW) (rated); 247,785 shp (184,773 kW) (trials)
- Propulsion: 4 × Westinghouse double-reduction geared steam turbines; 8 × Babcock & Wilcox Type-M boilers at 925 pounds per square inch (6.38 MPa) and 975 °F (524 °C); 4 × shafts, 2-four blade props, 2-five blade
- Speed: 30 kn (56 km/h; 35 mph) (service)
- Capacity: 1,972 passengers
- Crew: 1,044
- SS United States (Steamship)
- U.S. National Register of Historic Places
- Coordinates: 30°7′9″N 86°46′45″W
- Architect: William Francis Gibbs
- Architectural style: Ocean liner
- NRHP reference No.: 99000609
- Added to NRHP: June 3, 1999

SS United States was an American ocean liner that was built during 1950 and 1951 for the United States Lines. She was the largest ocean liner to be entirely constructed in the United States and the fastest ocean liner to cross the Atlantic Ocean in either direction, earning the Blue Riband for the highest average speed since her maiden voyage in 1952, a title that remains uncontested.

The ship was designed by American naval architect William Francis Gibbs and could have been converted into a troopship if required by the United States Navy in time of war. The ship served as a US icon, transporting celebrities and immigrants throughout her career between 1952 and 1969. Her design included innovations in steam propulsion, hull form, fire safety, and damage control. Despite her record speed, passenger counts declined in the mid-1960s due to the rise in jet-propelled trans-Atlantic flights.

United States was withdrawn from service in a surprise announcement in 1969. All planned cruises were canceled, and the ship changed owners repeatedly for the next several decades. Every owner attempted to make the ship profitable, but she was aging and poorly maintained. In 1984, her interior furnishings were sold at auction, and the rest of her interiors were stripped to the bulkheads in 1994. In 1996, she was towed to Philadelphia, where she remained until February 2025.

In 2009, the SS United States Conservancy started raising funds in an attempt to save the ship from being scrapped. The group purchased her in 2011 and had created several unrealized plans to restore the ship. Due to a rent dispute, in 2024, the ship was evicted from her pier. Because no other locations for the ship could be found, Okaloosa County in Florida was able to purchase the ship and sink her near Destin to become an artificial reef. United States was sunk on November 11, 2026, surpassing USS Oriskany as the world's largest artificial reef and HMHS Britannic as the largest passenger liner ever to sink.

== Development ==
=== Design ===
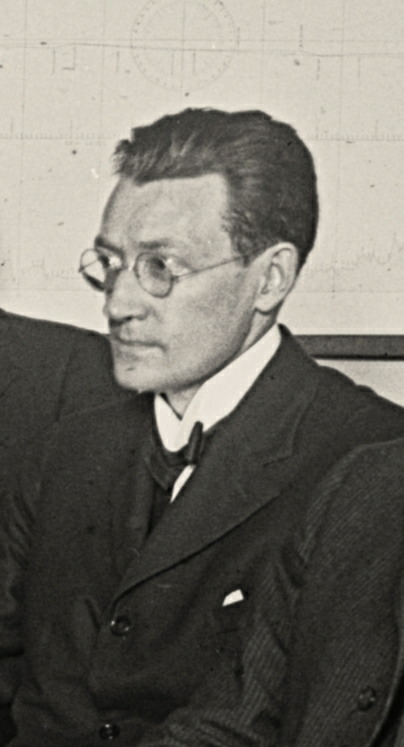
William Francis Gibbs, whose lifelong goal was the design of what became the United States

SS United States was designed by William Gibbs. When Gibbs was eight years old in 1894, he watched the launching of SS St. Louis and became enamored with ships and dreamed of a massive, grand, American ship to surpass all others.

As an adult, Gibbs' first project was to lead the redesign and reconstruction of the ocean liner Leviathan, the largest ship in the world and an American war prize following World War I. Once complete, his skill was appreciated by the government, media, and other architects. The Pacific Marine Review referred to him as "America's foremost naval architect".

The first ship purely of Gibbs' design was SS Malolo, a luxury liner for the Pacific Ocean. During her sea trials, the ship was struck amidship by a freighter, ripping a massive hole into Malolo's engine room. The damage was so severe the former Chief of US Navy Construction and Gibbs' mentor David Taylor thought the ship would immediately sink, much like RMS Empress of Ireland did in similar circumstances. The ship stayed afloat with little damage and few casualties; this success was credited to Gibbs' meticulous designs, further increasing his fame.

Gibbs' work put him in contact with American officials, to whom he pitched his idea for a massive, American-flagged liner. By 1936, the US government was planning to replace the aging Leviathan, so a new vessel could operate as a passenger liner during peacetime and as a troop transport during war. Although not the massive ocean liner Gibbs had envisioned, he was selected to design the new ship, which became the SS America.

At the end of the Second World War, Gibbs and his company had designed more than 70% of all American ships used during the conflict, and Gibbs was at the height of his career. He believed it was time to realize his vision of an American superliner.

=== Military application ===
During World War II, many ocean liners, including Normandie and Queen Mary, were seized or requisitioned by governments and used to transport soldiers between fronts. In 1945, the US Maritime Commission requested designs for a ship that could handle that role for future conflicts. Gibbs submitted a design of his decades-old vision, which eventually won the contract.

The most-promising use of the liner in war would have been as a troop transport. If mobilized, onboard furnishings could easily be removed to make room for a 14,400-man US Army division. The ship's size and speed meant she could rapidly deploy a division anywhere in the world without needing to refuel.

=== Construction ===
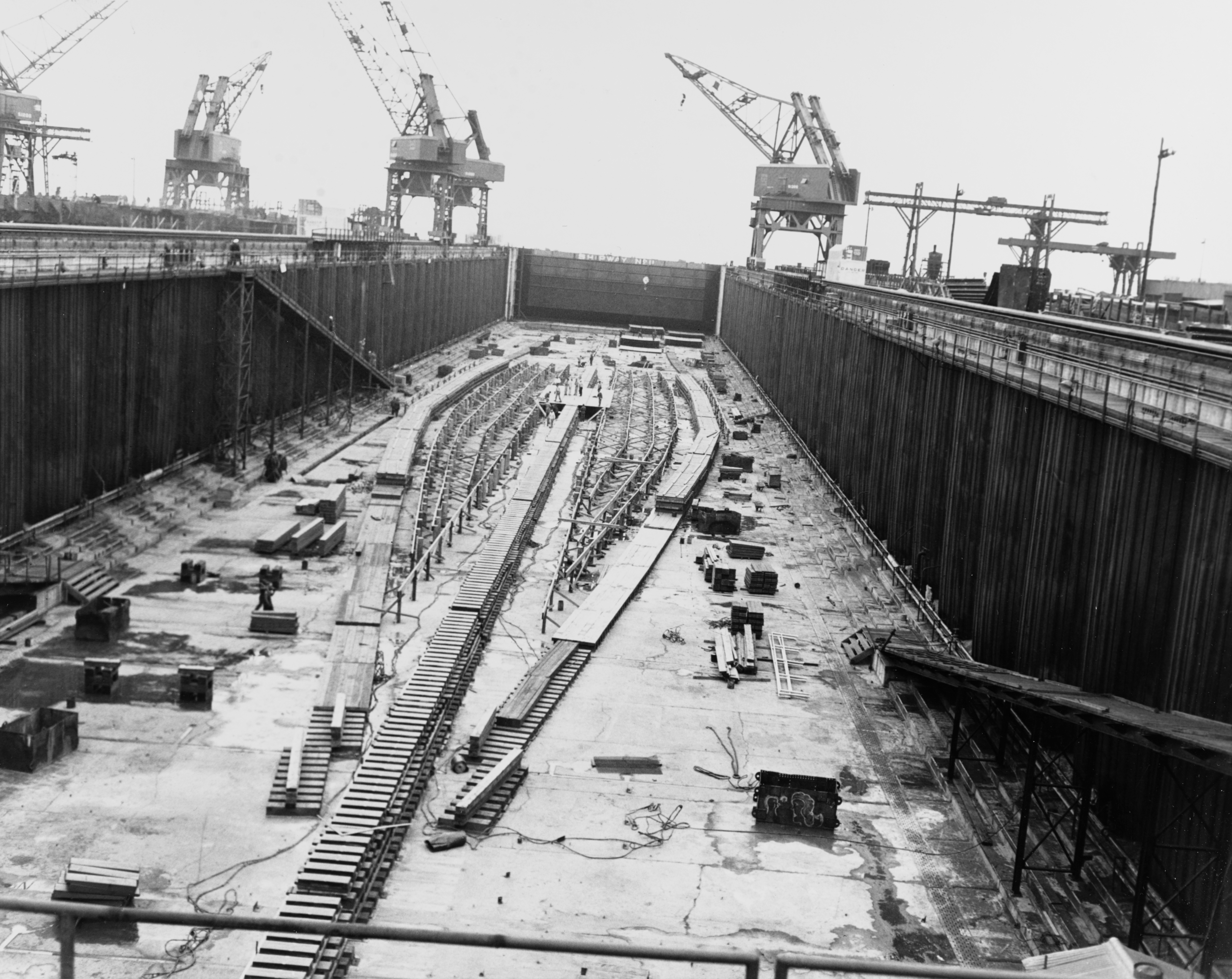
Keel of USS United States (CVA-58) at Newport News Shipbuilding, which was dismantled to allow for construction of the ocean liner

Following the end of World War II, the newly formed US Department of Defense was divided about its policy in the nuclear age. There was controversy around the supercarrier USS United States (CVA-58), which was canceled after her keel was laid. The shipyard, looking for a project to fill the void left by the United States Navy, agreed to dismantle the aircraft carrier and build an ocean liner with, coincidentally, the same name, in the same dry dock, allowing her keel to be laid on February 8, 1950. The circumstance saw United States become the first ocean liner to be built in a dry dock, accelerating her construction because parts of the ship could be prefabricated.

Another major issue facing the Navy was its reduction of transport capabilities following the war. After the Inchon Landings during the Korean War, the Department of Defense realized it lacked troop-transport capacity and requisitioned the one-third-completed United States to quickly and cheaply fill part of the deficit. Under Navy control, stateroom bathrooms were to be stripped and large spaces divided to make room for gun mounts, wardrooms, more lifeboats, and equipment required to support the enlarged passenger count.

United States was requisitioned under Secretary of Defense Louis Johnson, who believed it was cheaper and easier to convert an existing vessel than to build a new one. Days after the announcement was made, the secretary was relieved and replaced by George Marshall. After meeting with the chairman of the Maritime Administration, Marshall believed converting United States would take too long to be of any use during the Korean War. A month after her requisitioning was announced, the Joint Chiefs of Staff reversed the decision and returned the ship to previously scheduled civilian work.

United States was christened and launched on June 23, 1951, sponsored by Lucile Connally, wife of US Senator Tom Connally. Her construction was a joint effort by the United States Navy and United States Lines (USL), and was broken into two parts. The cost of construction was split; USL contributed $25 million and the US government $20 million. The government also paid another $25 million for the incorporation of "national defense features" into her design, which brought her cost to $71.08 million, even though the ship itself cost only $44.4 million.

== Features ==
=== Propulsion ===
The ship's power plant was developed in cooperation with the Navy, leading to a militarized design. The ship never used US Navy equipment; the designers opted for civilian variants of military models. The engine room arrangement was similar to that of large warships such as the Forrestal-class aircraft carriers, with isolated engineering spaces, and redundancies and backups in onboard systems.

In normal service, the ship could theoretically generate 310,000 pounds (140,000 kg) of steam per hour, at 925 pounds per square inch (6.38 MPa) and 975 °F (524 °C), using eight US Navy-type M-type boilers; however, they were operated at 54% of their capacity. The boilers were divided among two engine rooms, four in each. Babcock & Wilcox designed the ship's boilers and manufactured those in the forward engine room; the other boilers were made by Foster Wheeler and were located aft.

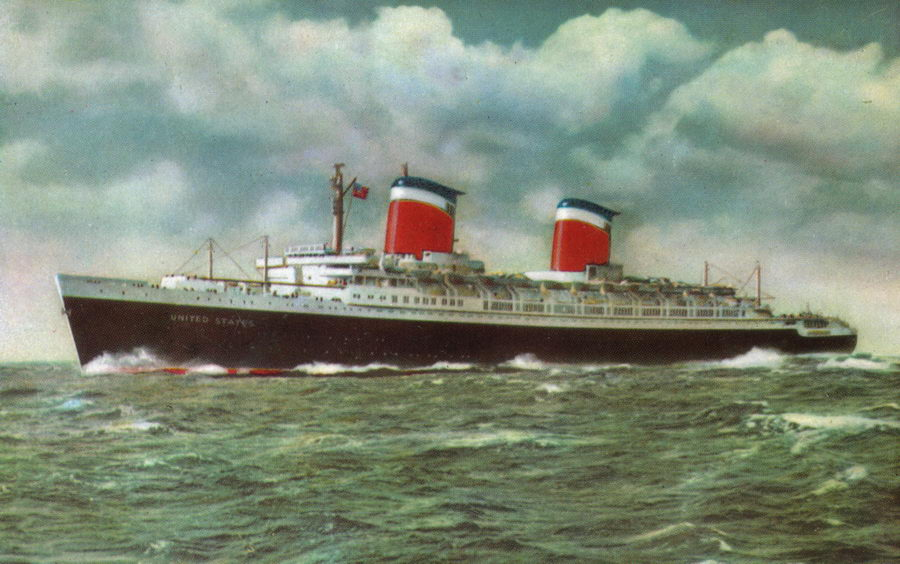
A colorized black-and-white photograph of SS United States taken during her sea trials. The ship's name, and a US flag on her foremast, have been added. (They were missing during her sea trials.)

Steam from the boilers turned four Westinghouse double-reduction geared turbines, each one connected to a drive shaft. Each turbine could generate approximately 60,000 shaft horsepower (45,000 kW), or 240,000 shp (180,000 kW) total. If at flank speed, initial designs estimated 266,800 shp (199,000 kW) from 1,100 °F (593 °C) steam at 1,145 pounds per square inch (7.89 MPa) could be generated.

The turbines turned four shafts, each of which rotated a propeller 18 feet (5.5 metres) in diameter. Owing to the designers' previous military experience, each propeller was made to efficiently rotate in either direction, allowing the ship to efficiently move forward or backwards, and to limit cavitation and vibrations. The two inboard propellers were five-bladed—a key secret of the design—and the outboard two had four. This aspect was one of the concepts that allowed the ship to achieve high speeds.

=== Funnels and superstructure ===
The primary purpose of a ship's funnels is to ventilate the vessel's engine rooms, allowing exhaust to escape. Gibbs believed funnels also create a unique and iconic character for the ship and her owners. To create an unforgettable silhouette, Gibbs had the liner topped with two massive, red-white-and-blue, tear-drop-shaped funnels located midship. Standing at 55 feet (17 m) tall and 60 feet (18 m) wide, they were the largest funnels ever put to sea.

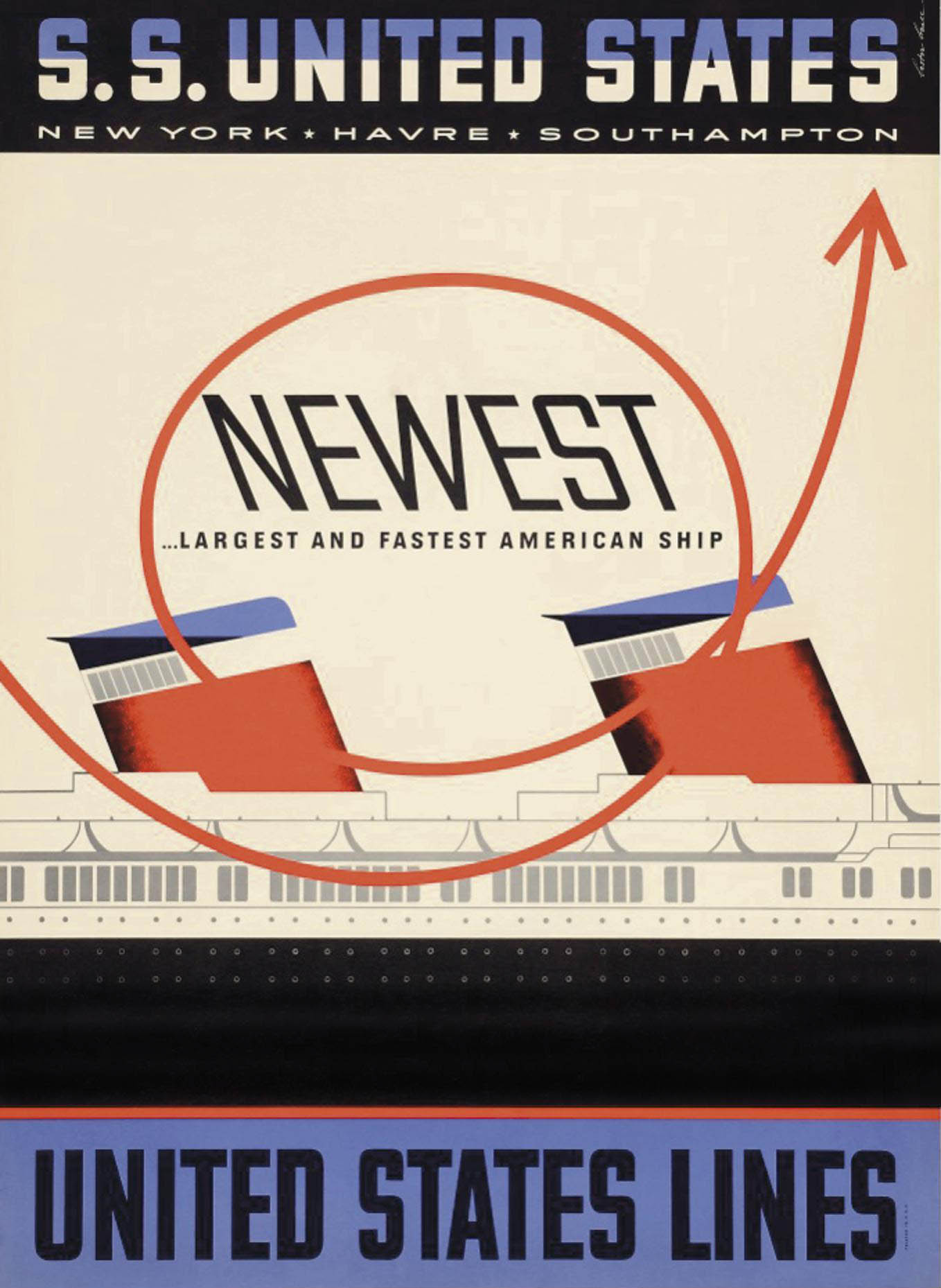
The ship's funnels became an icon due to their unique color, shape, and size (promotional poster pictured).

The funnel design was a pinnacle of Gibbs' experience from designing the reconstruction of Leviathan and the designing of the America and Santa-class liners. To prevent soot from coating the deck and passengers, horizontal fins on each side of the funnels deflected funnel exhaust away from the ship. During the retrofit of the Leviathan decades earlier, it was discovered her tall funnels compromised the vessel's stability. To avoid this issue on United States, Gibbs decided the funnels and the superstructure would be made out of lightweight aluminum to prevent the ship from becoming top-heavy and risk capsizing. At the time, United States was the world's largest aluminum construction project and the first major application of aluminum on a ship.

The main disadvantage in making the funnels and superstructure out of aluminum was the metal's difficulty to mold and handle compared to more conventional metals, making the funnels' fabrication the most complex part of the ship's construction. Special care was needed to prevent galvanic corrosion of the aluminum when it was welded to the steel decking. The laborious process antagonized shipyard workers but no problems arose during construction and it continued as planned.

=== Speed ===
The maximum speed attained by United States is disputed and was once held as a military secret, and complicated by the alleged leak of a top speed of 43 knots (80 km/h; 49 mph) the ship attained after her first speed trial. The New York Times reported in 1968 the ship could make 42 knots (78 km/h; 48 mph) at a maximum power output of 240,000 hp (180,000 kW). Other sources, including a paper by John J. McMullen & Associates, placed the ship's highest-possible sustained speed at 35 knots (65 km/h; 40 mph). The liner's top achieved speed was later revealed to be 38.32 knots (70.97 km/h; 44.10 mph), which she achieved during a full-power trial run on June 10, 1952.

== Interior design ==
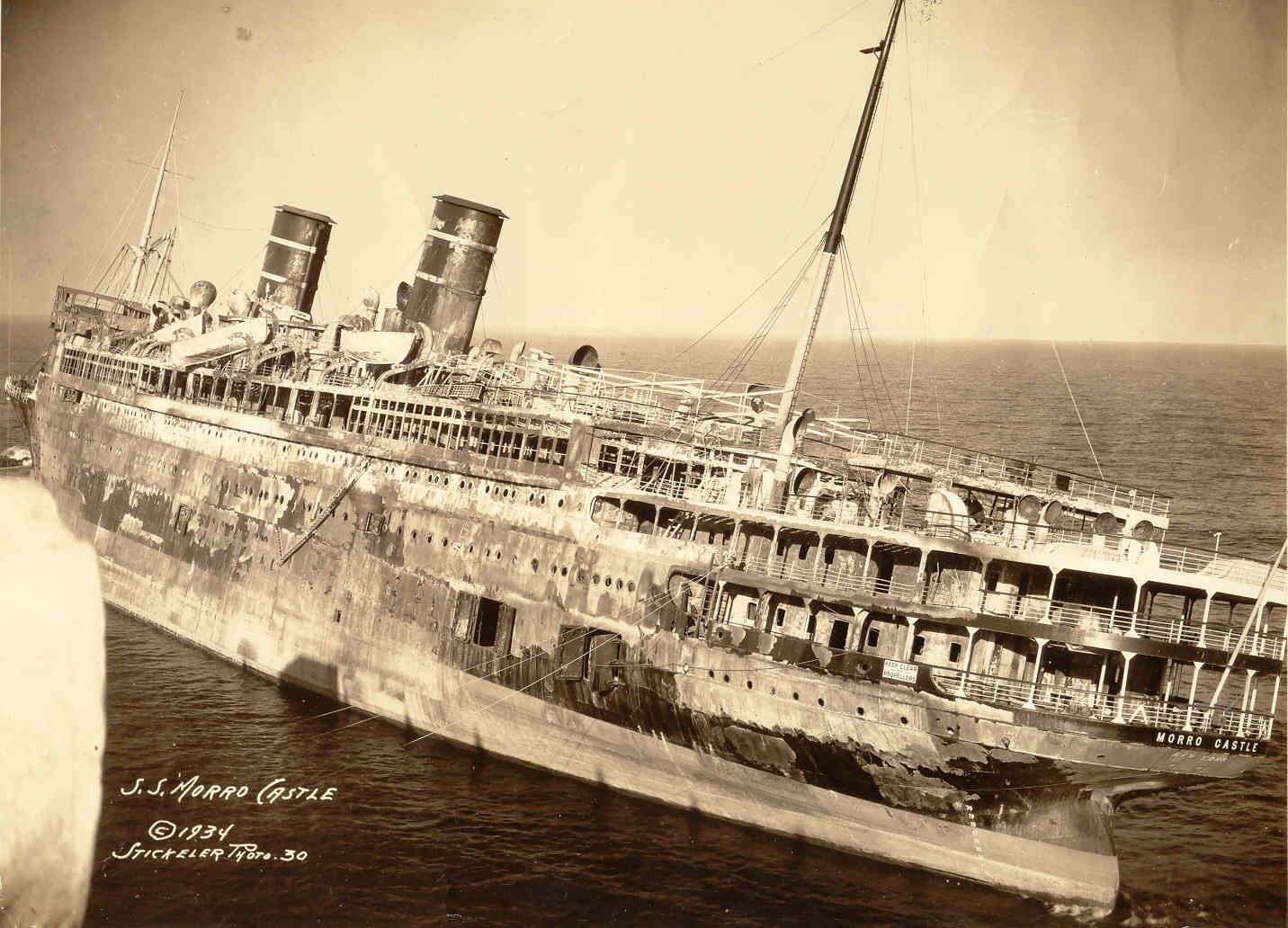
The burned wreck of Morro Castle, whose loss influenced strict fire safety on United States

Dorothy Marckwald and Anne Urquhart, who also designed the interiors for America, designed the interiors for United States. Their goal was to "create a modern fresh contemporary look that emphasized simplicity over palatial, [with] restrained elegance over glitz and glitter". Marckwald and Urquhart also wanted to replicate the smooth lines seen on the exterior and to visualize the ship's speed.

To achieve the aesthetic, the liner was furnished with mid-century modern decor that was amplified by plentiful use of black linoleum decking and the silver lining of edges. While visually unique compared to her competition, the simplicity of decorations compared to the expected grandeur of ocean liners saw the interiors described by those accustomed to the older style as what would be found on a "navy transport".

Interior décor included a children's playroom that was designed by Edward Meshekoff, who was also tasked with creating interiors that were completely fireproof. This caused an exceptional difficulty when selecting materials, such as those for usually flammable items such as drapes or carpet.

=== Fire safety ===
As a result of maritime disasters involving fire, including SS Morro Castle and SS Normandie, William Gibbs specified the ship must be fully fireproof, which further compounded his history with safety and attention to detail.

To minimize the risk of flames, the designers of United States proscribed the use of wood in the ship, aside from the galley's wooden butcher's block. Fittings, including furniture and fabrics, were custom made in glass, metal, and fiberglass to ensure compliance with the US Navy's fireproofing guidelines. Asbestos-laden paneling was extensively used in interior structures and many small items were made of aluminum. The ballroom's grand piano was originally designed to be aluminum but was made from mahogany and accepted only after a demonstration in which gasoline was poured upon the wood and ignited, without the wood catching fire. Additionally, instead of traditional teak decking, the exterior decks were covered with a green latex composition called "Neotex".

=== Art ===
To create the onboard art, the artists Hildreth Meière and Austin Purves consulted Marckwald. The artists' goals were to give the ship a unique character that was detached from any single art style. Because the ship was going to serve as a floating icon of the US, it was decided her character would reflect the country. This was achieved by theming spaces around an aspect of the United States, such as the Mississippi River, Native Americans, or American fauna.

The liner was decorated with hundreds of unique art pieces, including sculptures, relief murals, and paintings. Aluminum was commonly incorporated into the artworks, allowing pieces to be light and fireproof, and to match the black-and-silver theme. For instance, nearly 200 aluminum sculptures were used in the first-class stairway, with a large eagle and each state's bird and flower emblems on the landing of each deck.

=== First class passenger spaces ===
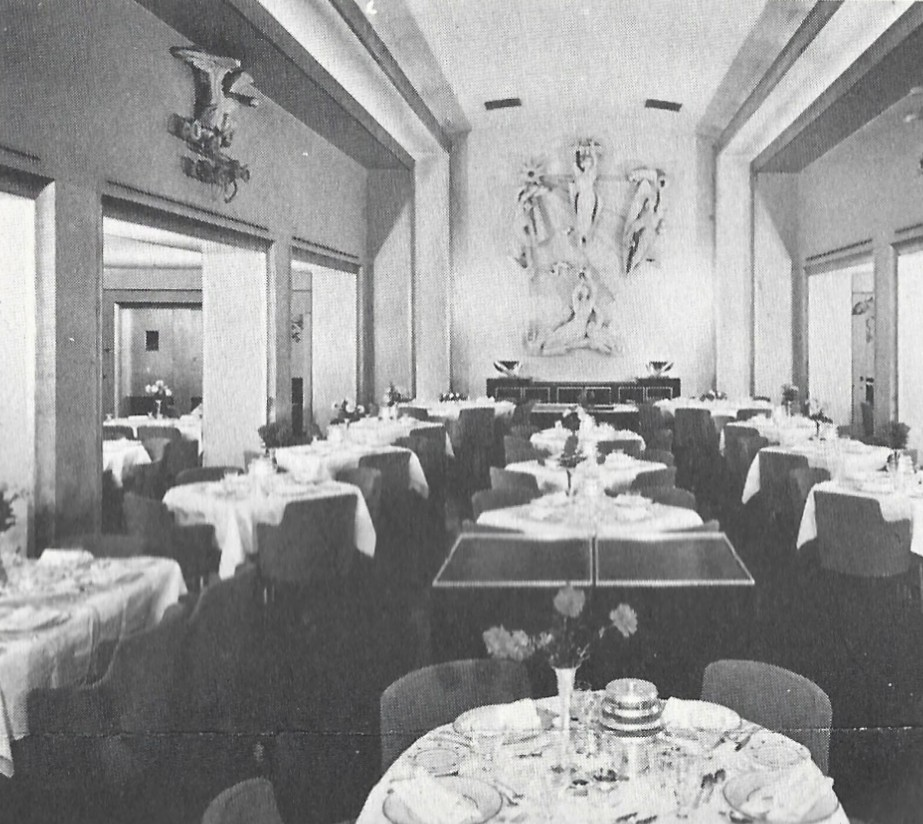
First class dining saloon

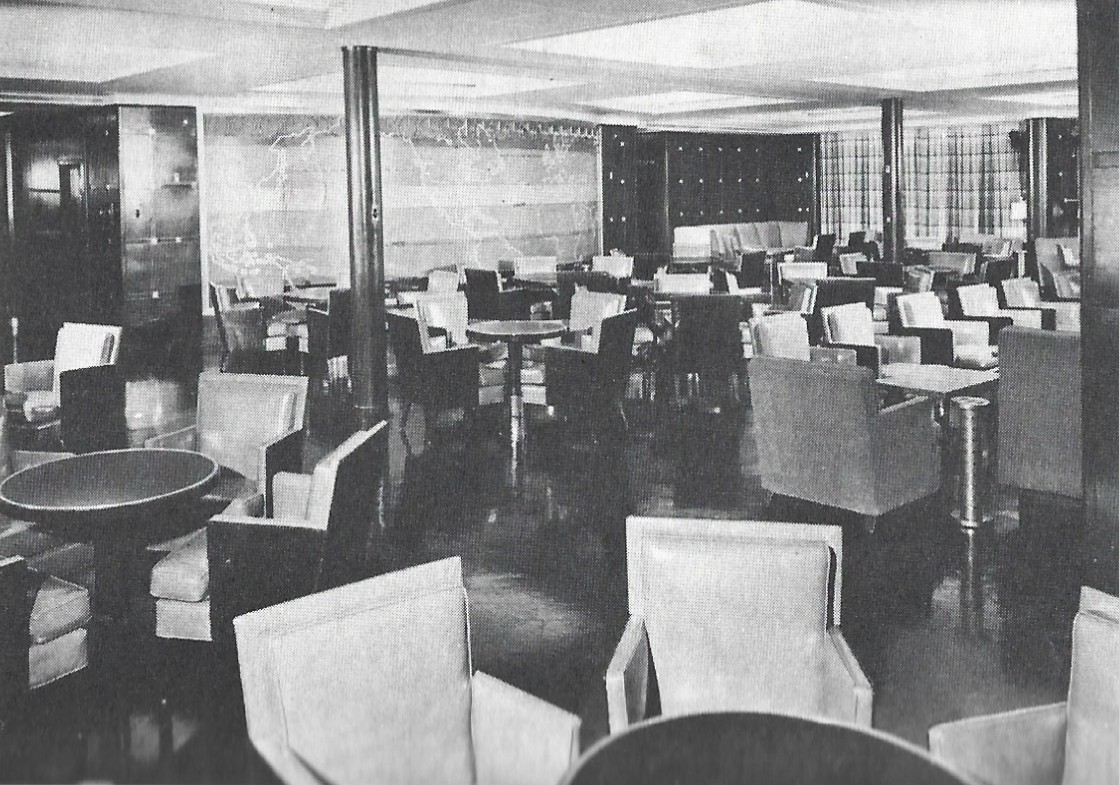
First class smoking room

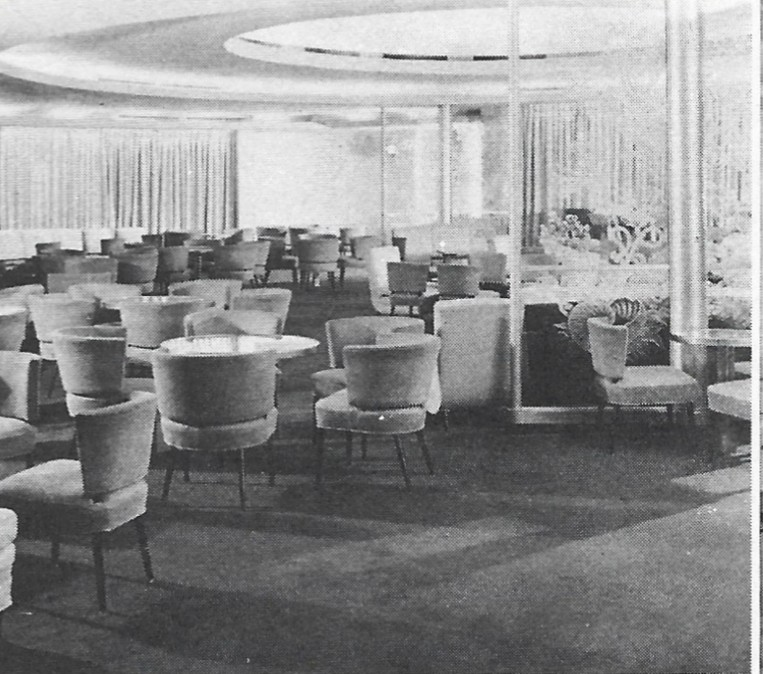
Another view of the first class ballroom

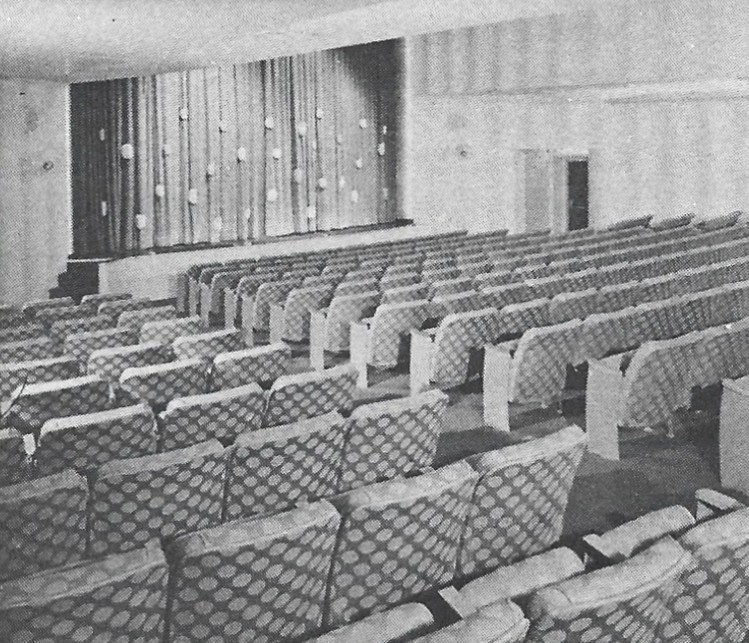
First class theater

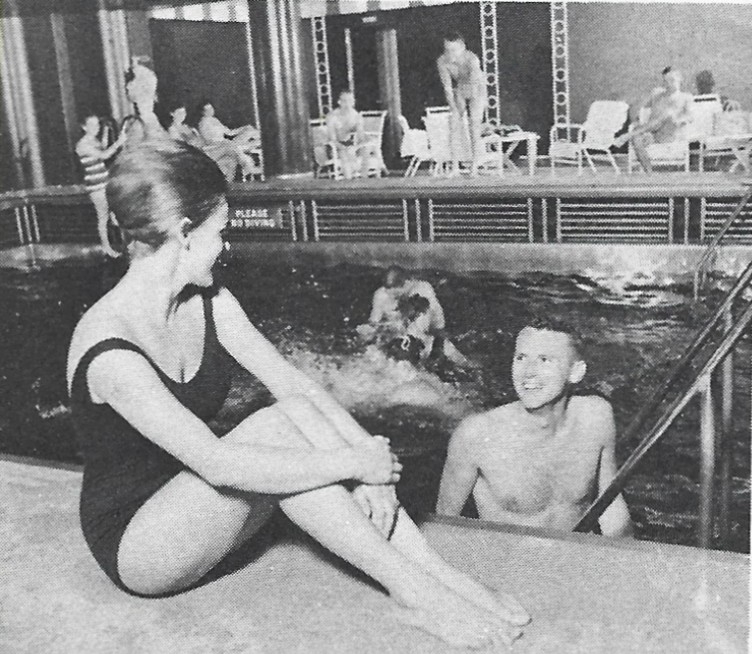
First class swimming pool

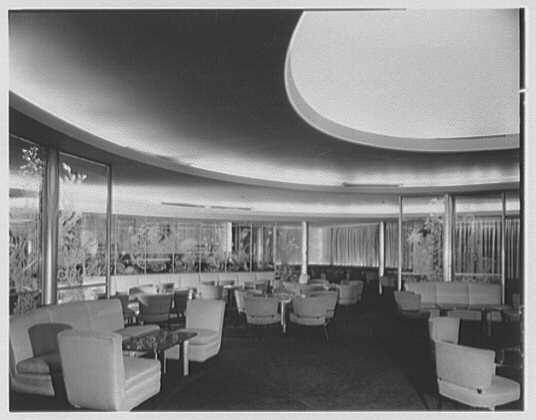
The grand ballroom, containing the piano and a dance floor. The space was reserved for first-class passengers.

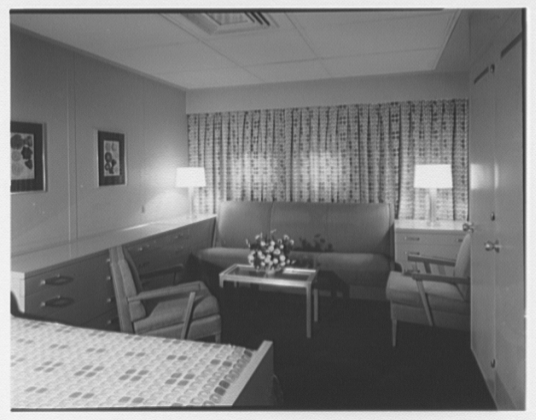
First-class cabin U 141, showing mid-century modern furnishings and the lack of detail common throughout the ship. Not shown is the cabin's private bath.

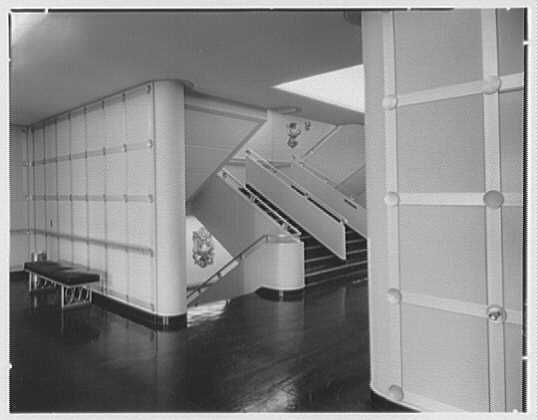
An onboard stairway, with an aluminum sculpture of the Great Seal of the United States on each landing

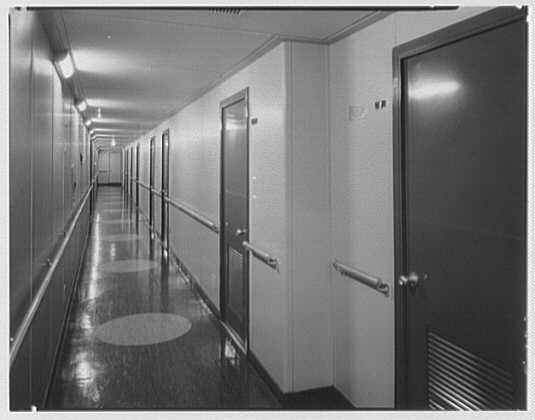
A passenger hallway whose lack of decoration was described as having decor compared to that of a warship

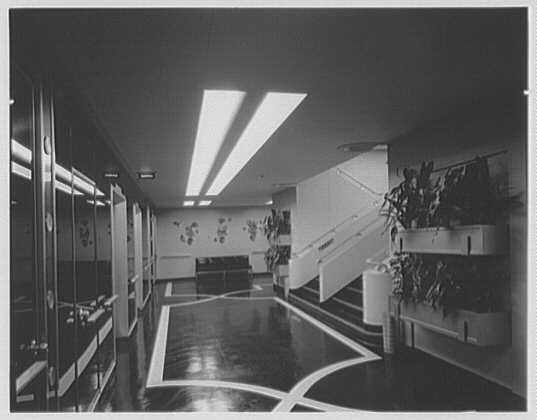
A landing showing the ship's motif of black linoleum flooring and silver lining

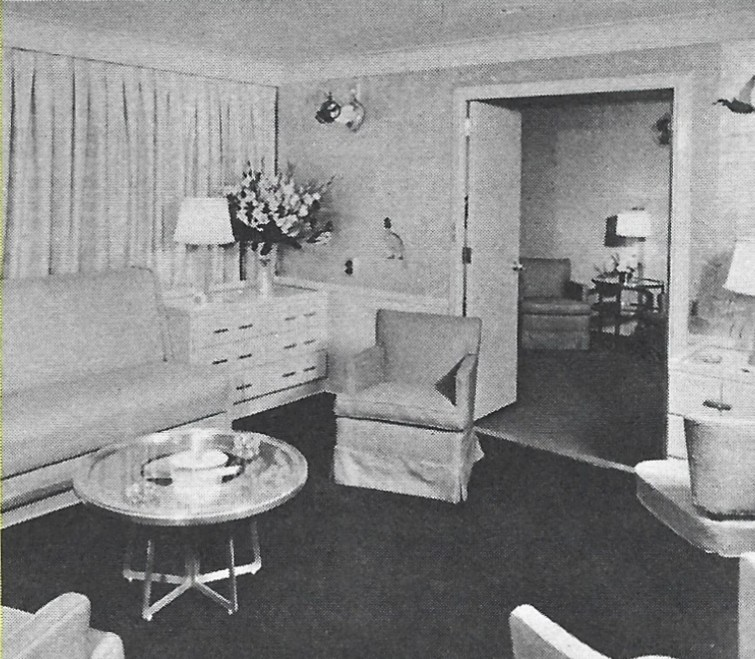
First class stateroom

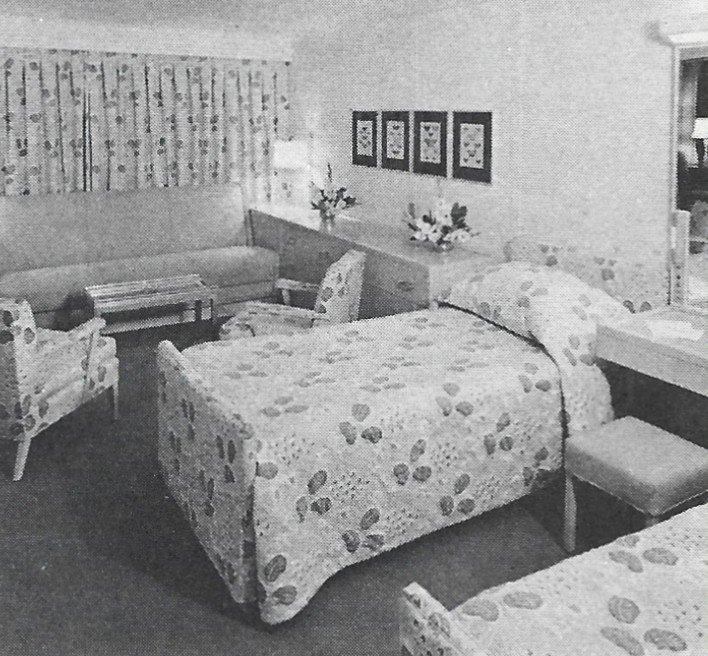
The bedroom of a first class stateroom

First class promenade

=== Cabin class passenger spaces ===
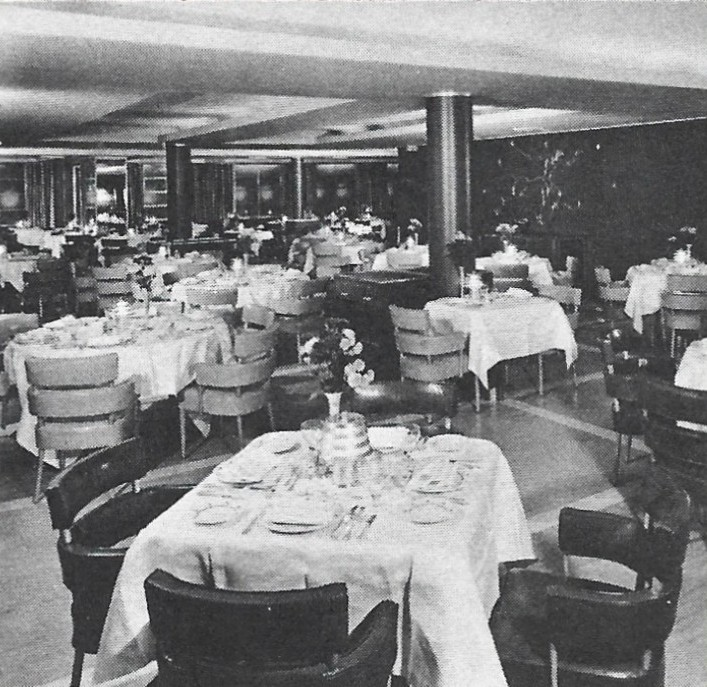
Cabin class dining saloon

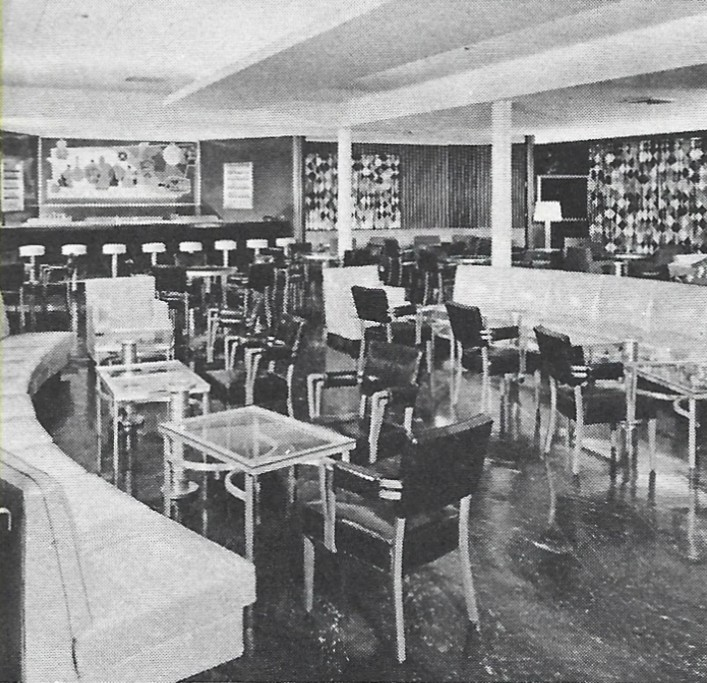
Cabin class smoking room

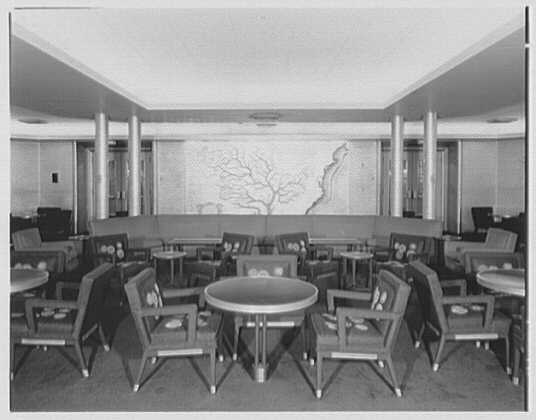
The Cabin-class lounge with Hildreth Meière's mural Mississippi in the background

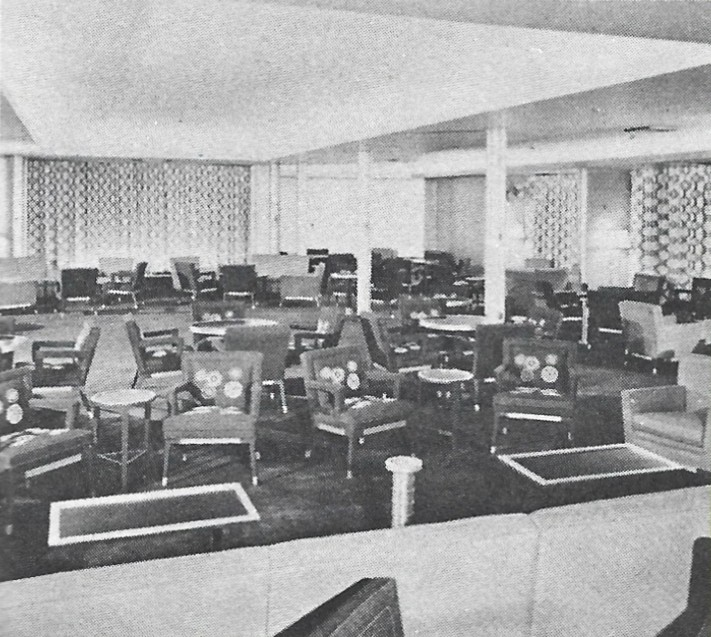
Another view of the cabin class lounge

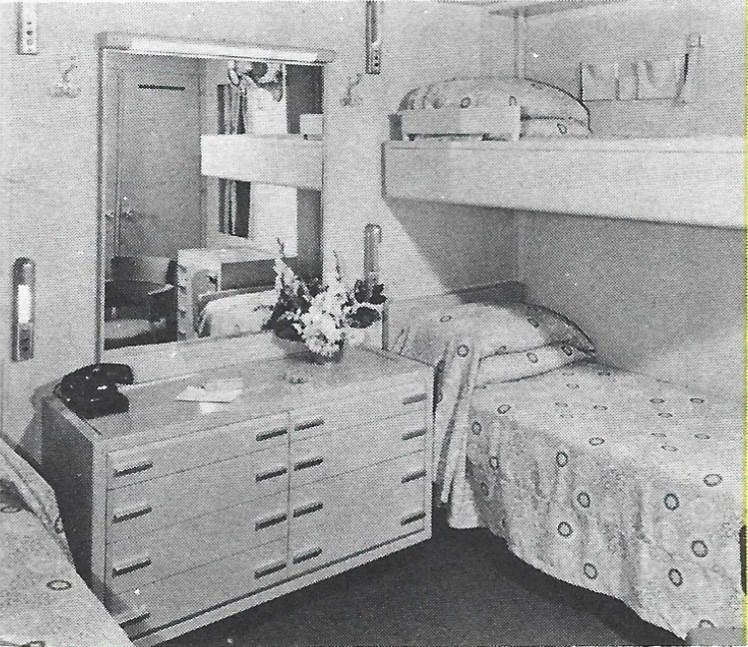
Cabin class stateroom

=== Tourist class passenger spaces ===
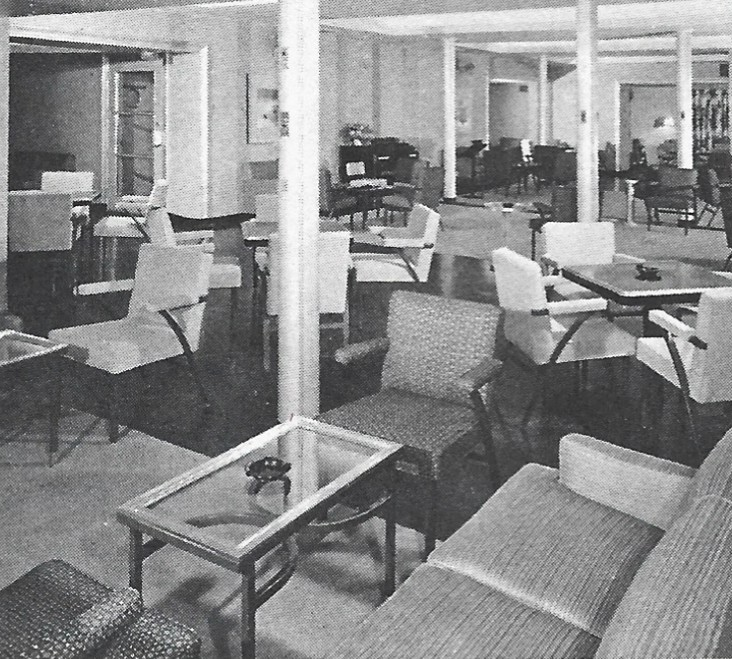
Tourist class lounge

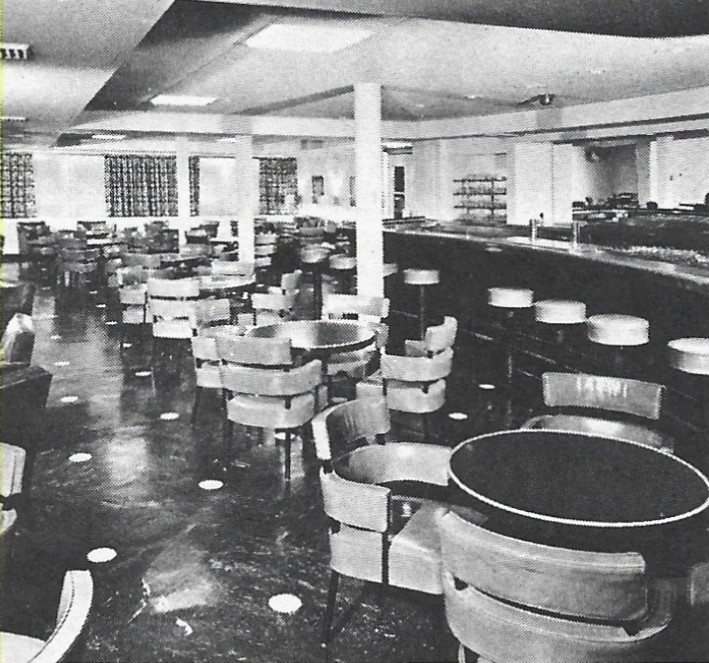
Tourist class smoking room

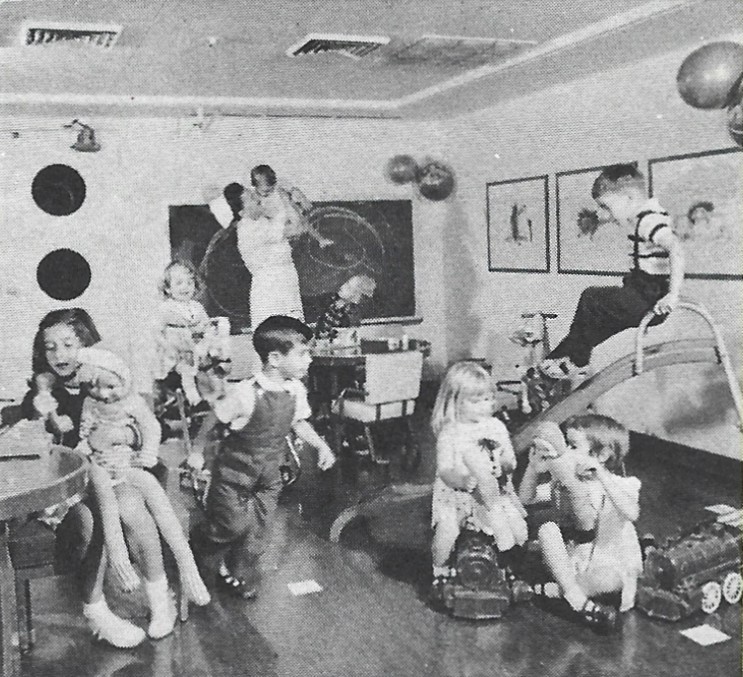
Tourist class children's playroom

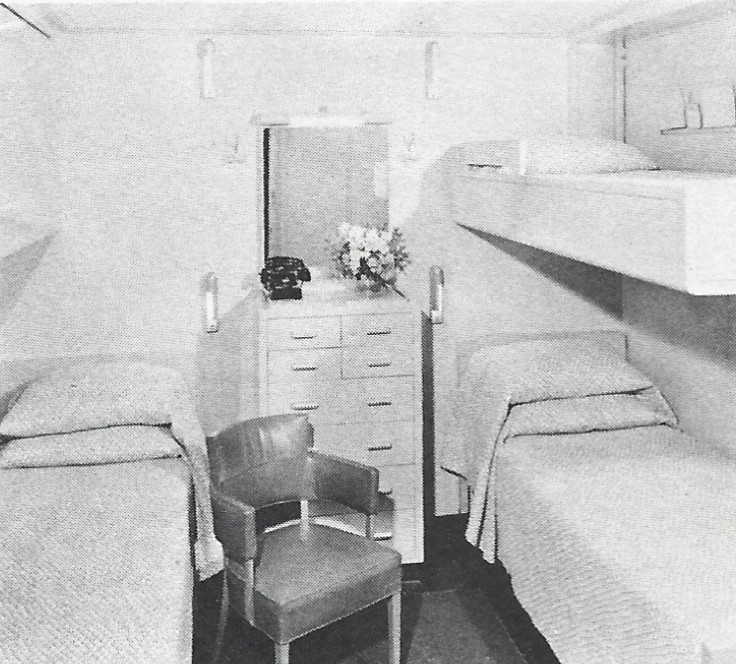
Tourist class stateroom

== Accommodations ==
Gibbs' design incorporated a conventional, three-tiered class system for passengers, replicating those found on other classical ocean liners. Each class was segregated, having its own dining rooms, bars, public spaces, services, and recreation areas. Gibbs envisioned having passengers enforce the separation, only intermingling in the gymnasium, swimming pool, and theater. The stark and physical class separations, an idea associated with the Old World, contrasted with the overall American theme of the ocean liner; the United States was often seen as a nation that was removed from the old money and class segregation of the Old World.

At maximum capacity, United States could have carried 894 first, 524 cabin, and 554 tourist-class passengers. During a standard season, the cost of a first-class ticket would start at $350 ($4,196 in 2024), a cabin ticket $220 ($2,638), and a tourist ticket $165 ($1,978).

=== First class ===
Tour of first-class spaces in current status
- https://www.youtube.com/watch?v=oYRofcGzi2w

First-class passengers were entitled to the best services and locations the ship had to offer, including the grand ballroom, the smoking room, first-class dining room and restaurants, observation lounge, main foyer, grand staircase, and promenades. Most of these facilities were located midship, distant from the vibrations and distractions of the engines and the outside.

The liner's famous passengers favored first class due to its prestige, priority service, and spacious cabins. The Duck Suite, which was popularized by the Duke and Duchess of Windsor, was the ship's best-known stateroom. It was created by combining three first-class staterooms into a single suite containing four beds, three bathrooms, two bedrooms, and a living room. The name came from the walls, which were decorated with paintings of waterfowl. Up to 14 similar suites could be created in a similar way, establishing a level of stateroom above that of a standard first-class ticket. Tickets for the two-bedroom suites started at $930 ($11,150); these were aimed at the wealthiest passengers on board. Much like the Duck Suite, these rooms reflected a post-war American standard of living, lacking in intricate details and adorned with natural scenes. All suites were spacious and equipped with dimmed lights, which were not seen on any other vessels.

=== Cabin class ===
Cabin class was aimed toward the American middle classes, striking a key balance between the affordability of tourist and the elegance of first class. Each cabin had four beds and a private bathroom, and were located primarily aft. While inferior to first class, passengers received service and had access to amenities that were historically reserved for the highest class on other ocean liners.The food, pool, and theater were shared with first-class passengers, making cabin class ideal for those who wanted the first-class experience without paying first-class rates.

=== Tourist class ===
Tourist class was aimed at those who were unable or unwilling to spend much on a ticket; it was often booked by migrants and students. Cheapest of all tickets, tourist-class cabins were located at the peripheries of the ship, where rocking and noise were most pronounced. These small cabins were shared among passengers, each room containing two bunk beds and simply furnished with little detail. Communal bathrooms were shared with all tourist-class passengers in the same passage. Service from the crew was lacking compared to the other classes, as tourist-class passengers received the lowest priority. While equivalent to the steerage or third-class on other vessels, these poorest conditions on United States were noticeably better than what was offered on other vessels.

== Commercial service (1952–1957) ==
=== Maiden voyage ===
The reception to the United States' maiden arrival in Southampton on July 8th 1952.

United States made her maiden voyage from July 3 to 7, 1952, and broke the eastbound-transatlantic speed record that had been held by RMS Queen Mary for the previous 14 years by more than 10 hours, making the crossing from the Ambrose lightship at New York Harbor to Bishop Rock off Cornwall, United Kingdom, in 3 days, 10 hours, and 40 minutes at an average speed of 35.59 knots (65.91 km/h; 40.96 mph), winning the coveted Blue Riband. On her return voyage United States also broke the westbound-transatlantic speed record, which was also held by Queen Mary, by returning to America in 3 days, 12 hours, and 12 minutes at an average speed of 34.51 knots (63.91 km/h; 39.71 mph). In New York City, her owners were awarded the Hales Trophy, the tangible expression of the Blue Riband competition.

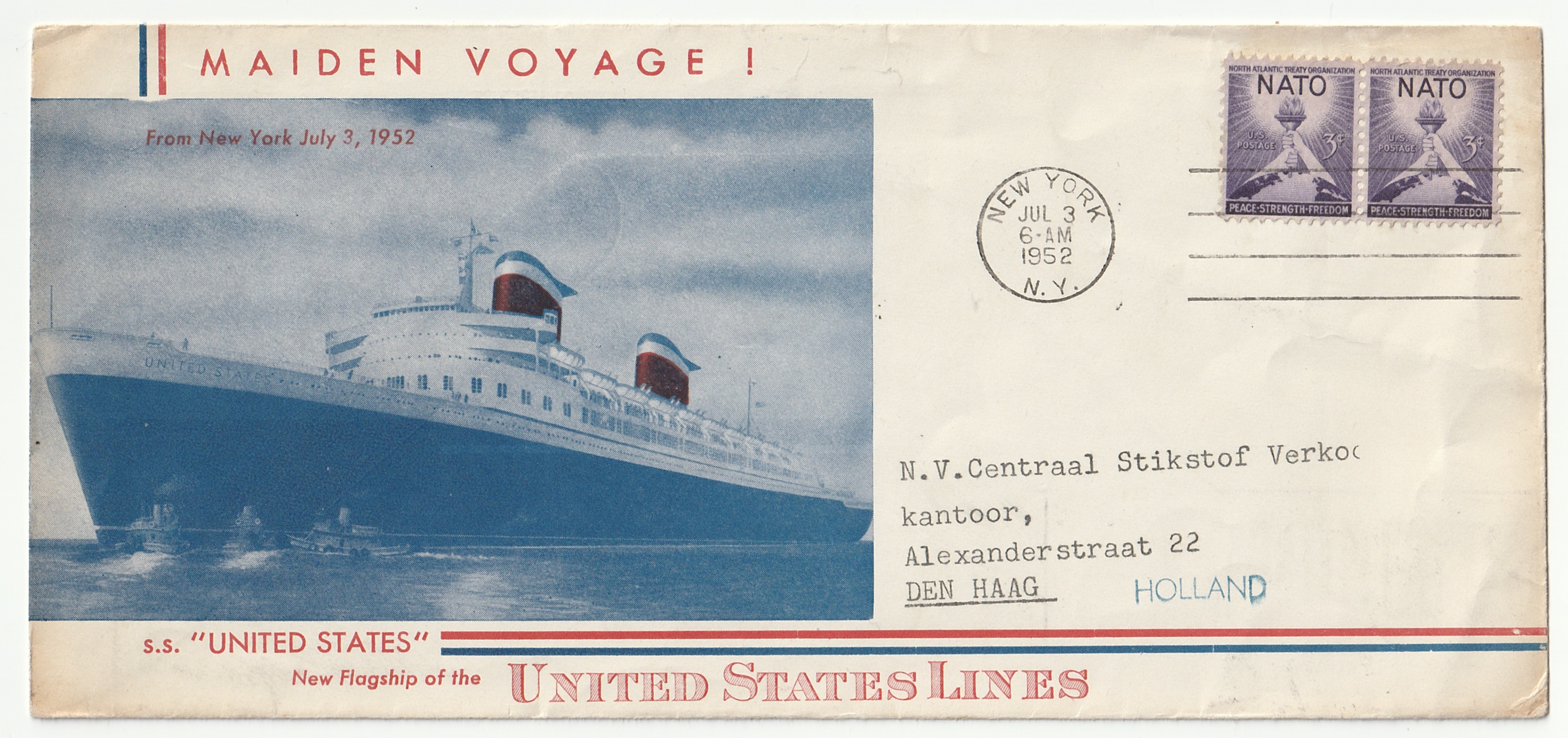
Eastbound maiden voyage cover sent on July 3, 1952

The ship's return to the United States was marked with celebration as she was escorted into New York City by bands, helicopters, and small boats, and was met by a crowd of thousands. As a public symbol of the Blue Riband, a long, blue flag was flown from her radar mast as she approached. Many people noticed her fresh hull paint had worn off, apparently due to the high speeds at which she traveled. Her crew was officially welcomed to the city several days later with a ticker-tape parade, escorted by more than 2,000 people and greeted by a crowd of 150,000. The centerpiece of the event was the liner's captain, Commodore Harry Manning, who is one of the few people to receive a Ticker-tape parade twice after his 1929 rescue of crewmembers from the cargo ship Florida.

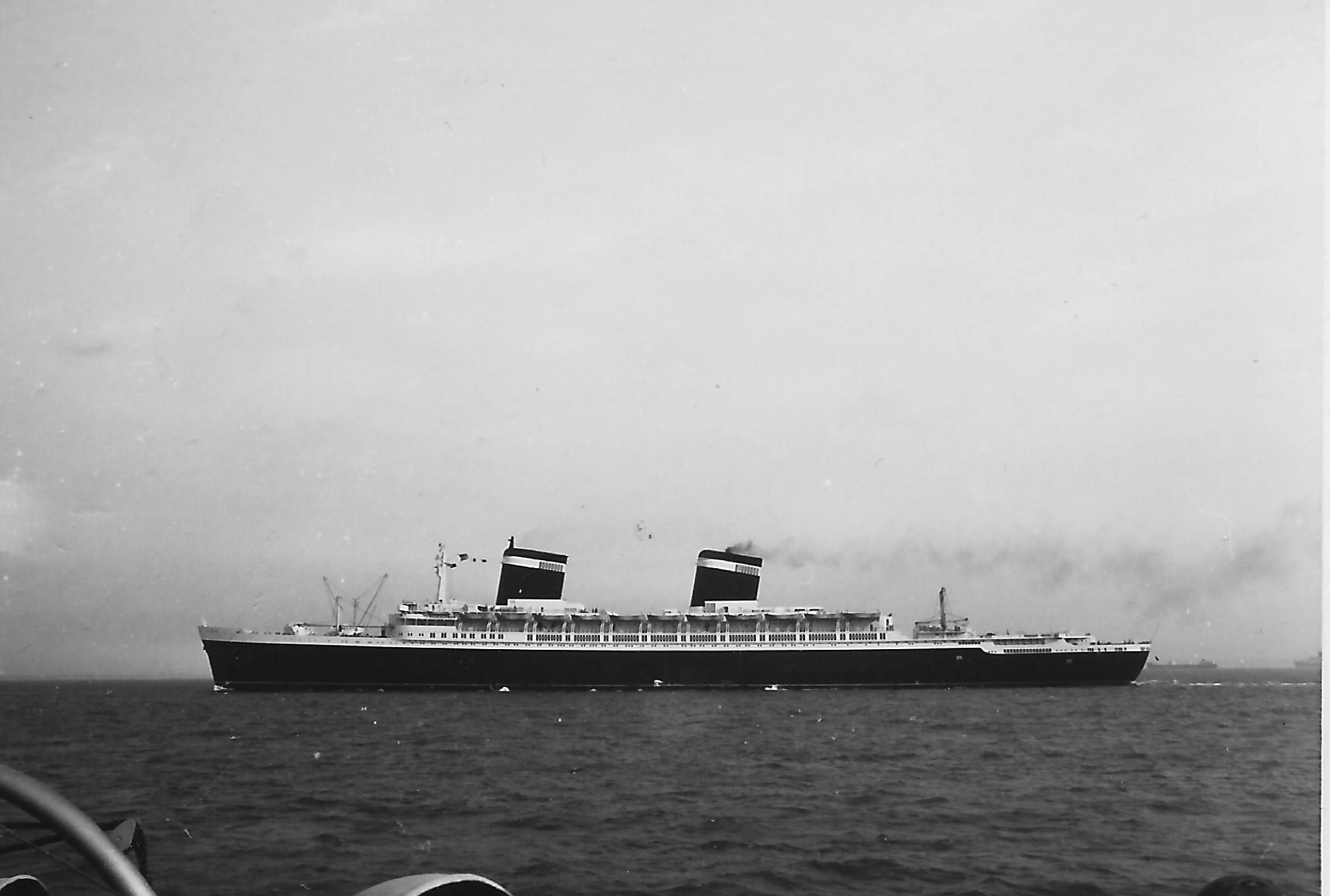
United States photographed from Portsmouth during her return maiden voyage to New York, summer 1952

The record was not a reflection of the ship's actual operational speed. Prior to her voyage, many expected a race between United States and the British vessel Queen Elizabeth for national pride over the Blue Riband. In 1951, Gibbs instructed the crew to "[not] beat the record by very much. Beat it by a reasonable amount, such as 32 knots." He hoped Cunard Line, which operated Queen Elizabeth, would then develop a slightly faster ship and United States would then break the intentionally low record, sailing at a much higher speed.

United States' record-breaking speed was also held back by safety concerns. The line understood the crew was still inexperienced with the new ship and ordered them to not take unnecessary risks with extravagant speeds. The memory of the sinking of RMS Titanic influenced USL's caution, an issue personal to several of its leaders. CEO John Franklin was son of White Star Line's office manager Philip Franklin during the Titanic disaster, and the company director Vincent Astor lost his father John Jacob Astor on that ship. Franklin was so concerned about a potential accident he had written and sealed a message that was only to be made public if there was a disaster during United States' maiden voyage.

=== Transatlantic travel ===
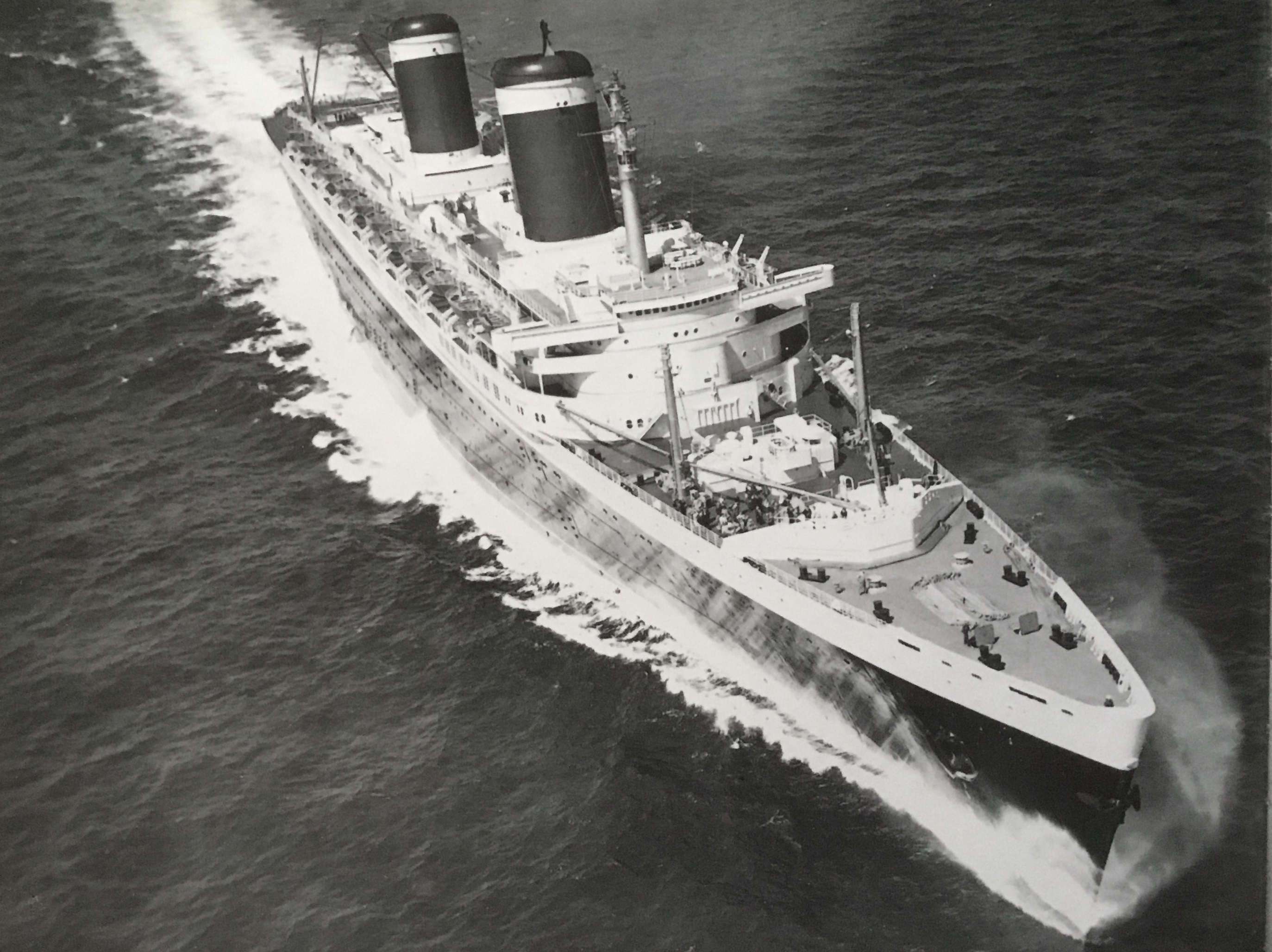
An aerial view of the United States making 35 knots across the Atlantic

For her regular service, the ship operated at her operational speed of about 30 to 32 knots (56 to 59 km/h; 35 to 37 mph) so the ship could maintain a schedule of five-night crossings. During the 1950s, United States was popular for transatlantic travel, sailing between New York, Southampton, and Le Havre, with an occasional additional call at Bremerhaven. She attracted frequent, repeat, celebrity passengers such as Marilyn Monroe, Judy Garland, Cary Grant, Salvador Dalí, Duke Ellington, and Walt Disney, who featured the ship in the 1962 film Bon Voyage!. An unrecognized celebrity on the ship was Claude Jones, a trombonist who had performed with Ellington; he worked as part of the waitstaff and died on board in 1962.

United States proved exceedingly successful and was the most-popular liner in the North Atlantic, and her fame provided her with a reliable clientele. United States Lines (USL) began drafting plans to create a "running mate" for the ship. Similar to Cunard Line's Queen Mary and Queen Elizabeth, the idea was to operate two liners in tandem with each other. In 1958, this idea evolved into a plan to build the SS President Washington, a superliner with a very similar design to United States. President Washington was planned to replace the aging USL liner America and was to operate on the United States' West Coast and sail the Pacific. The idea was never realized because the US Congress did not allocate any funds to the project.

== Decline (1957–1969) ==
=== Transatlantic jet age ===
In 1957, for the first time ever, piston-powered aircraft carried more passengers across the Atlantic than did ocean liners. This trend escalated as the advent of jet-propelled airliners provided trans-Atlantic routes that were only hours long, compared to days on the fastest ocean liners. The competition threatened to redirect the customers of USL and other shipping companies, although the economic threat of aircraft was initially dismissed as a fad.

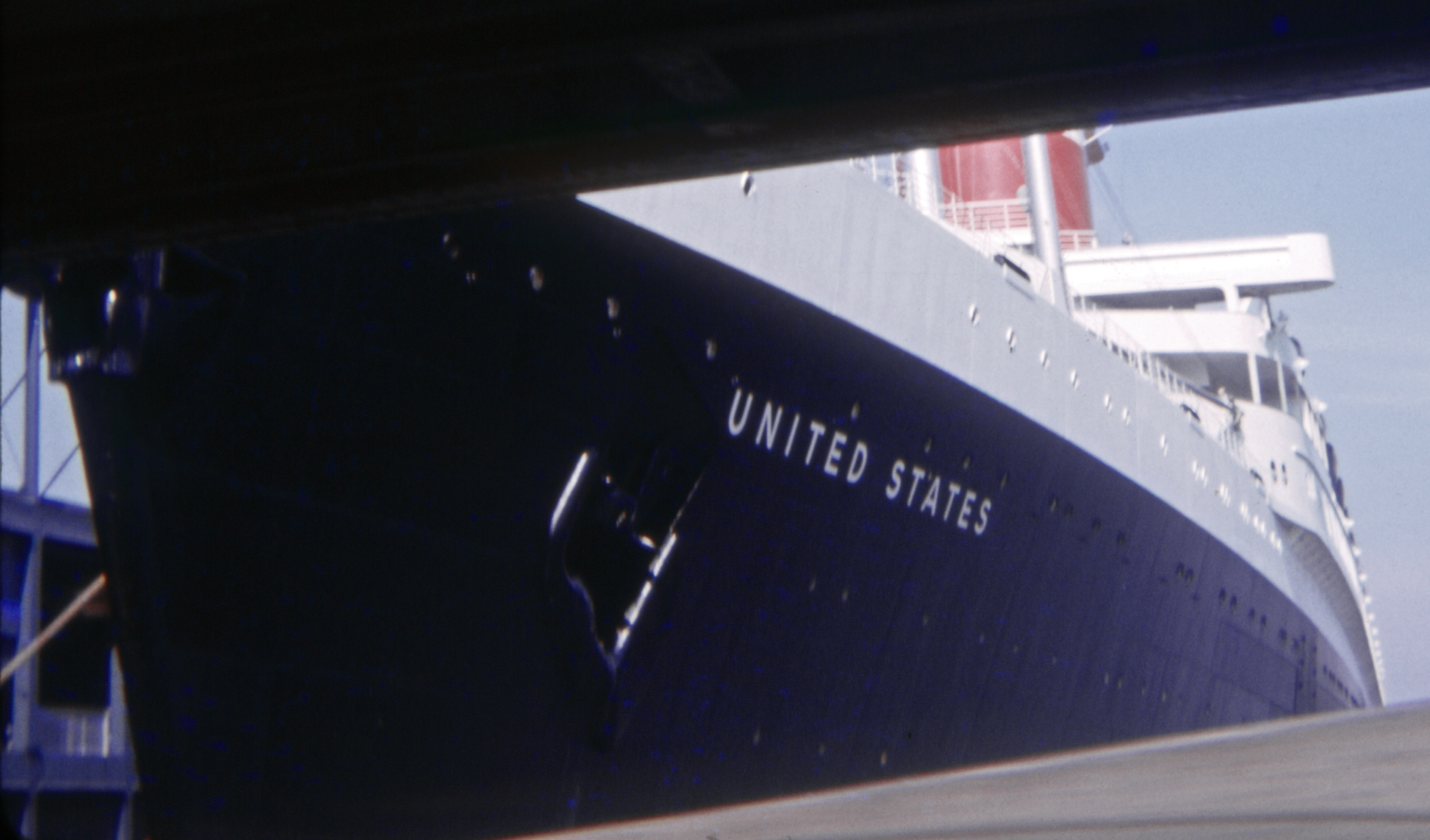
SS United States in New York, July 1964

Throughout the 1960s, the liner's reputation was permanently altered during strikes by the Masters, Mates, and Pilots Union that forced the cancellation of voyages and the reassignment of passengers. A ticket no longer guaranteed a trip aboard, and passengers and the company began to tire of the unreliable service.

The cancellations and competition from airlines slowly drew away customers. In 1960, USL refused to release a yearly passenger count because it had become so low. The issue further compounded in 1961, when the US Department of Commerce announced United States would no longer be used to carry US military personnel or their families. It was believed liners were "sitting ducks for Soviet bombers" and that air transport was a better option. The loss of the contract was a major blow to the company and the stark decline in passenger numbers meant change was needed.

=== Prospective cruise ship ===
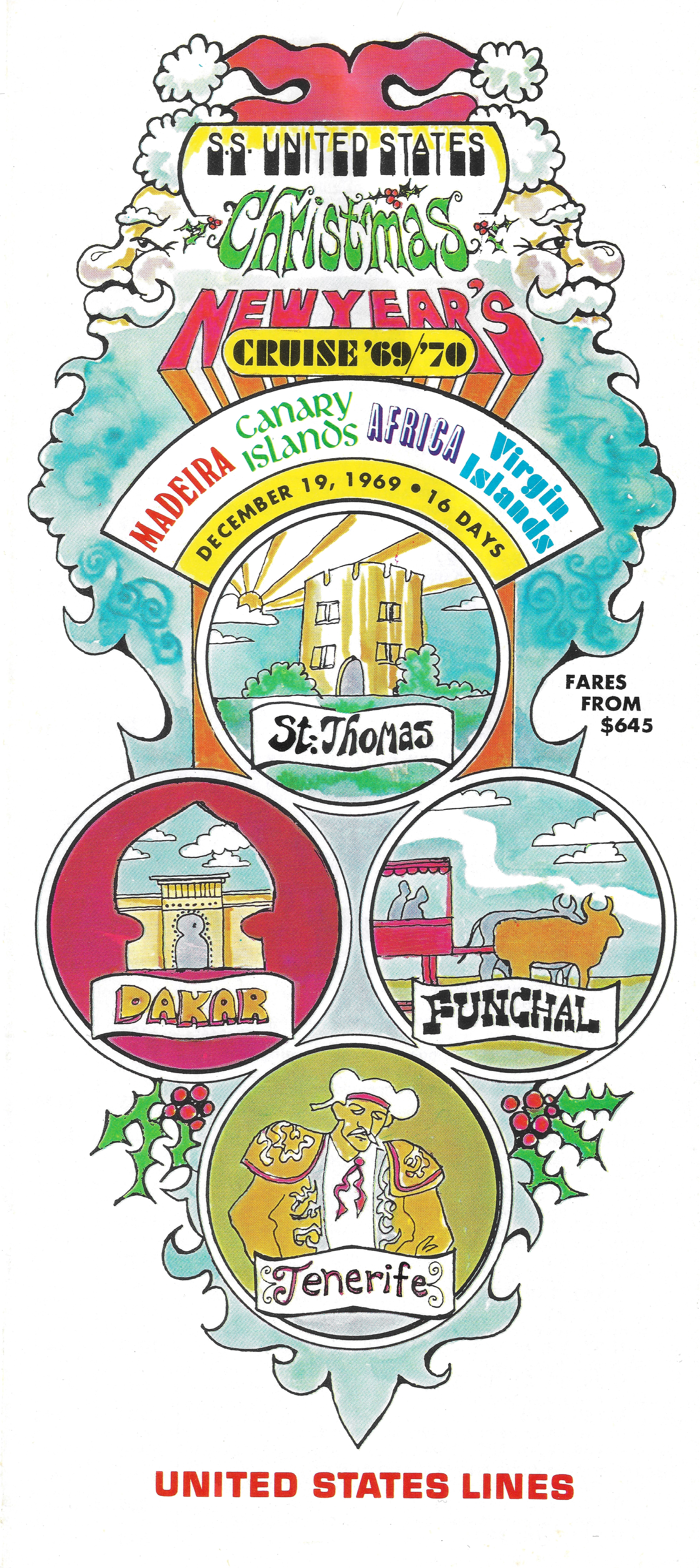
A pamphlet for a New Year's cruise onboard United States. As USL's profit dropped, the ship began offering cruises to exotic locations in an attempt to recover passenger counts. Like several other voyages, the trip was canceled following the ship's layup in 1969

To increase ticket sales, USL planned to convert the liner America to a cruise ship, ending trans-Atlantic service for vacation destinations around North America. Similar plans were drafted for United States, which would operate as a cruise ship during the less-busy winter season. The ship's cabin-class lounge would be replaced by a swimming pool and every stateroom would be fitted with a bathroom to attract vacationers. The cash-strapped company was wary of new projects and soon abandoned the idea because the refit was priced at $15 million. The new corporate strategy was to develop a major advertising campaign that was aimed at reinventing the allure of ocean liners in the age of jet aircraft by promoting the ship's speed, luxury, reputation, or another aspect of United States.

By 1961, conditions had not improved. For the first time, a voyage was canceled because only 350 people bought tickets. The US Government was subsidizing USL under the condition trans-Atlantic service must be maintained regardless of its profitability; this rule was repealed after pressure from the company. With USL now able to set unique itineraries, and hoping to exploit a new market, United States made her first cruises in the Caribbean the next year. Cruises sailed from New York and docked in Nassau, St. Thomas, Trinidad, Curaçao, and Cristobal. United States was the largest ship in the region and operated with a temporary pool on her aft deck and no tourist-class passengers.

Despite the new itinerary, United States was the most expensive liner to operate and was losing passengers to newer ships such as SS France. By 1963, anxiety about United States' future reached crew members and corporate leaders, many of whom were unsure how long the ship would be left in service. Two years later, another strike forced the cancellation of all summer voyages, losing the ship 9,000 passengers and the company $3 million.

In 1968, the Atlantic liner routes were declining, with only United States, France, and Queen Elizabeth conducting sailings. To distinguish herself from the competition, United States began offering much-longer voyages to distant ports in Europe, Africa, and South America. She again became the most-popular ship in the Atlantic. In 1968, USL was bought by Walter Kidd & Co, who believed the age of ocean liners had passed. Exacerbating matters, US government subsidies for the ship were curtailed because there were insufficient passenger numbers to justify the cost.

=== Retirement ===
Throughout her service, United States regularly brought in between $16 million and $20 million but her expenses grew from an initial $18 million to $26 million. In one of her first years of operation, the ship made USL a profit of $3 million; in 1960, she began running at a $2 million loss, and by the 1968 fiscal year, she cost the company $4 million despite stable revenue.

Due to strike-related costs, increasing union dues, decreasing government subsidies, a rise in alleged corporate mismanagement, and general passenger disinterest, United States was due for retirement. On October 25, 1969, United States returned from her 400th voyage and was ordered to start a scheduled yearly overhaul in Newport News early. This move canceled a planned 21-day cruise, although bookings for future voyages were still being made.

== Layup in Virginia (1969–1992) ==
=== Layup and US Maritime Administration (1969–1980) ===
While at Newport News for a scheduled annual overhaul, USL announced United States was being withdrawn from service on November 11. While many saw the ship's layup as inevitable, the decision came as a shock to passengers and crew. With no warning, newly unemployed crewmembers had only days to finalize work while passengers' awaiting baggage was loaded onto Leonardo da Vinci for a new cruise. At the time of her withdrawal, United States had made 800 transatlantic crossings (400 round trips), steamed 2,772,840 nautical miles (3,190,930 mi; 5,135,300 km), and carried 1,025,691 passengers. That month, the Navy sealed and dehumidified the ship to minimize decay. When the ship was sealed, all furniture, fittings, and crew uniforms were left in place. Her funnels were left half-painted when work suddenly halted.

SS United States while laid up in Norfolk in 1978

In June 1970, United States was moved across the James River to the Norfolk International Terminal in Norfolk, Virginia. In 1973, USL transferred ownership of the vessel to the United States Maritime Administration. In 1976, Norwegian Caribbean Cruise Line (NCL) was reported to be interested in purchasing the ship and converting her into a Caribbean cruise ship but the US Maritime Administration refused the sale due to the classified nature of the ship's naval design elements, forcing NCL to purchase the former France instead. The Navy declassified the ship's design features in 1977. The same year, a group headed by Harry Katz sought to purchase the ship and dock her in Atlantic City, New Jersey, for use as a hotel and casino, but the plan was never realized. By 1978, the Maritime Administration deemed United States worthless to the government and allowed her to be sold.

However, a document from the Government Accountability Office (GAO) disputes the widely accepted events of the 1970s which are portrayed above. In particular, the belief that classified design features hampered the sale of the ship to interested parties. According to the GAO, the United States Maritime Administration (MARAD) attempted to sell or charter the ship to private parties immediately upon taking possession in February 1973.

At first, "The S.S. United States was offered for sale to United States citizens for operation under the American Flag", according to the GOA document. Auctions were conducted with opening bids of $12.1 million and later $7.5 million. Although some parties apparently expressed interest during these early auctions, all bids were disqualified for failing to be accompanied by a 10% deposit. After three unsuccessful auctions to sell the ship between 1973 and 1975, the rule regarding potential buyer's use of the ship was expanded in 1976 "... to allow the sale of the S.S. United States for use as a floating hotel in or on the navigable waters of the United States." Two more auctions (in 1976 and 1978) were conducted under the new terms and with a new, lower opening bid of $5 million. As with previous auctions, no bids were accompanied by a 10% deposit, so there was no sale.

The eventual buyer of the ship, United States Cruise Lines, headed by Richard Hadley, made a deal with MARAD to purchase the ship in September 1978 outside of the typical auction process. Another interested party, Sea Containers, was angry at what it felt was a clandestine sale of the ship and filed a complaint. The GAO found Sea Container's complaint to be without merit in a 1979 ruling and the sale to Hadley moved forward.

=== Hospital ship (1970s) ===
By the 1970s, the US Navy had retired all of its hospital ships. The now-laid up United States was studied for potential conversion in 1983 because her size and speed would allow her to rapidly deploy to address any crisis around the world. Under the name USNS United States, it was planned she would have a capacity of about 1,600 hospital beds, be fitted with an aft helicopter deck, a bow vertical replenishment deck, and a refurbished interior that would have included up to 23 operating theaters and a full set of specialist rooms comparable to any major hospital on land. The plan was led by the Department of Defense and the ship was to be based in the Indian Ocean. The Navy believed the plan was too expensive and impractical and chose to take no action on the matter.

=== Richard Hadley and stripping (1980–1992) ===
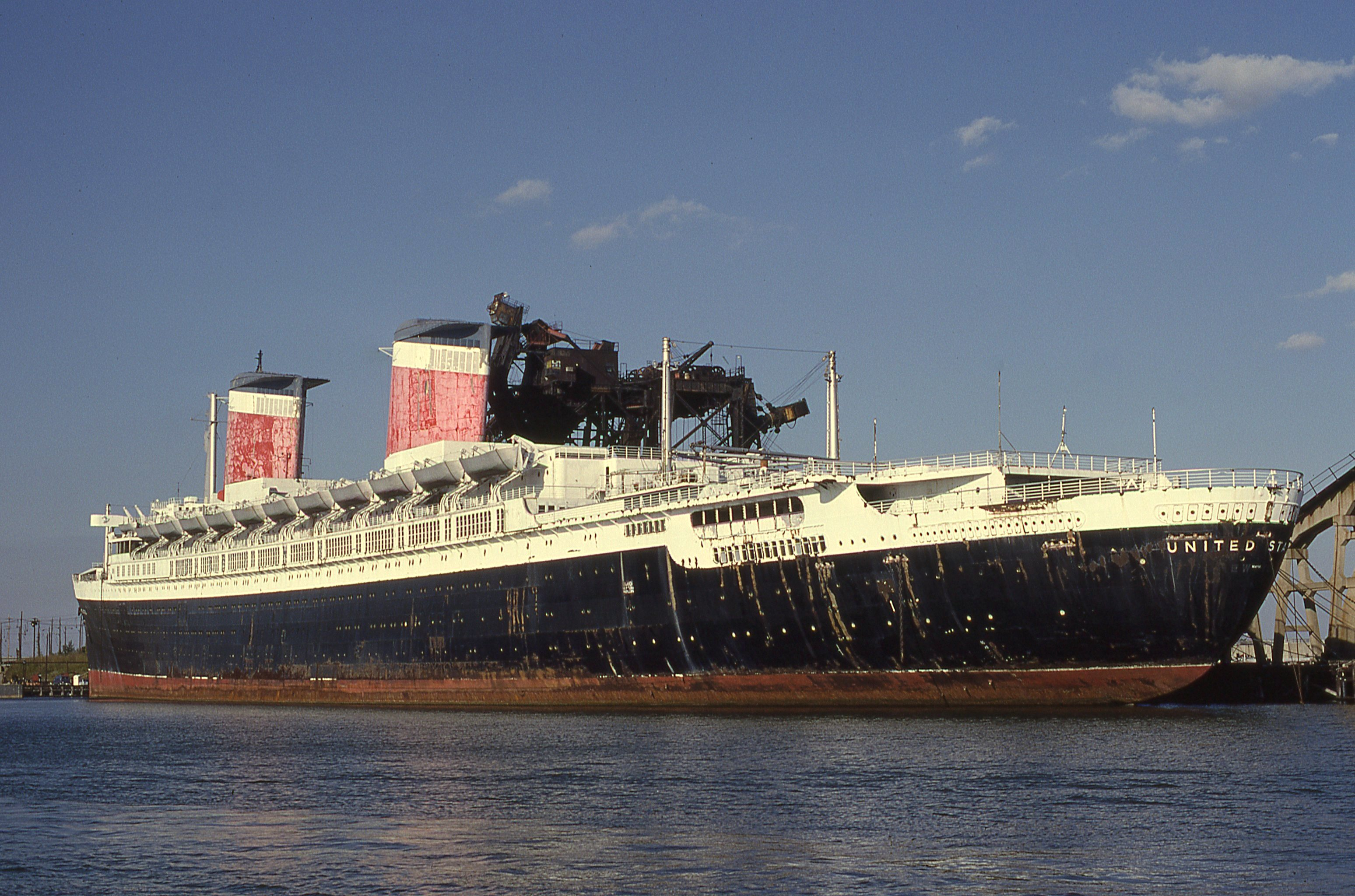
SS United States in Hampton Roads in 1989

In 1980, United States was sold for $7 million to a group headed by the Seattle developer Richard H. Hadley, who hoped to convert the liner into a floating condominium. Under Hadley's ownership, the ship was neglected and her interiors became ruined with rust. In 1984, to pay creditors, the ship's fittings and furniture, which had been left in place since 1969, were sold at auction in Norfolk, Virginia. The auction took place between October 8 and 14, 1984; about 3,000 bidders paid $1.65 million for objects from the ship.

On March 4, 1989, United States was towed across Hampton Roads to the CSX coal pier in Newport News. Hadley's plan of a time-share-style cruise ship failed financially and the ship was seized by the United States Marshals Service and put up for auction by the US Maritime Administration on April 27, 1992.

=== Marmara Marine Inc. (1992–1996) ===
Kahraman Sadıkoğlu, a Turkish businessman who was a partner of Marmara Marine Inc, was interested in buying the vessel. He first saw her when a friend of his told him that she was to be auctioned off. But after the first auction was cancelled, he left empty-handed. He went for a second auction two months later, and he lost interest after it was also cancelled. While in New York, he was notified that a third auction took place and that his previous offer of $2.6 million was accepted.

SS United States after arriving under tow in Tuzla, Istanbul

The Turkish president, Turgut Özal, invited Sadıkoğlu to a business meeting at the Hotel Plaza Athénée after hearing the news. During the meeting, he described the situation as: "There's a Turkish businessman amongst us tonight. First he bought the Savarona that was destined for scrapping and got it functioning again; and now he has bought the SS United States. This legendary ocean liner will be in the seas once again."

On the morning of June 5, 1992, the ship was eased out of Newport News and departed under tow across the Atlantic for Turkey, arriving 35 days later. Sadıkoğlu and Özal welcomed the ship from the MV Savarona as the liner passed through the Dardanelles Strait for refurbishment at a shipyard in Tuzla, Istanbul. Upon her arrival, members of Greenpeace and the media protested the ship due to her asbestos interior lining, due to the material's nature as a carcinogen. After debate, it was agreed that the ship would first undergo asbestos removal in Ukraine. On October 22, 1993, she was towed to Sevastopol, Ukraine, and arrived on November 1. Protests from Greenpeace and their flagship Rainbow Warrior continued.

While in Sevastopol, a 200-person team worked to gut down the ship's interiors to the bulkheads. Hundreds of tons of materials were offloaded onto the docks and scrapped. She was towed back to Turkey after the asbestos removal was completed. By now, Marmara Marine Inc. had invested so much money in her asbestos problems that parts of the ship, such as the lifeboats, were sold off to pay the shipyard. When work was completed in 1996, the company was out of money.

== Layup in Philadelphia (1996–2025) ==
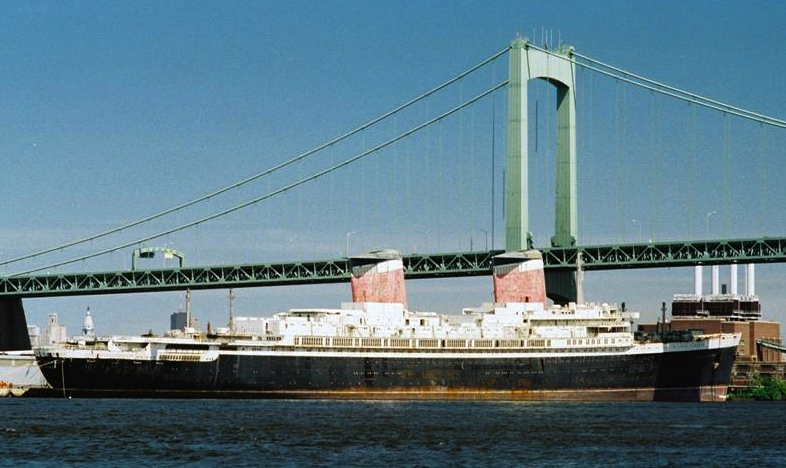
SS United States in Philadelphia, late 1990s

=== Government seizure and Edward Cantor (1996–2003) ===
United States was seized by the United States Marshals Service for the second time, as the owners of the previous company were unable to pay debtors. She was towed to the United States and laid up in Philadelphia, Pennsylvania, in 1996 before being put up for auction.

In November 1997, Edward Cantor purchased United States for $6 million. Two years later, the SS United States Foundation and the SS United States Preservation Society, Inc. (which would later become the SS United States Conservancy) succeeded in having the ship placed on the National Register of Historic Places.

=== Norwegian Cruise Line (2003–2011) ===
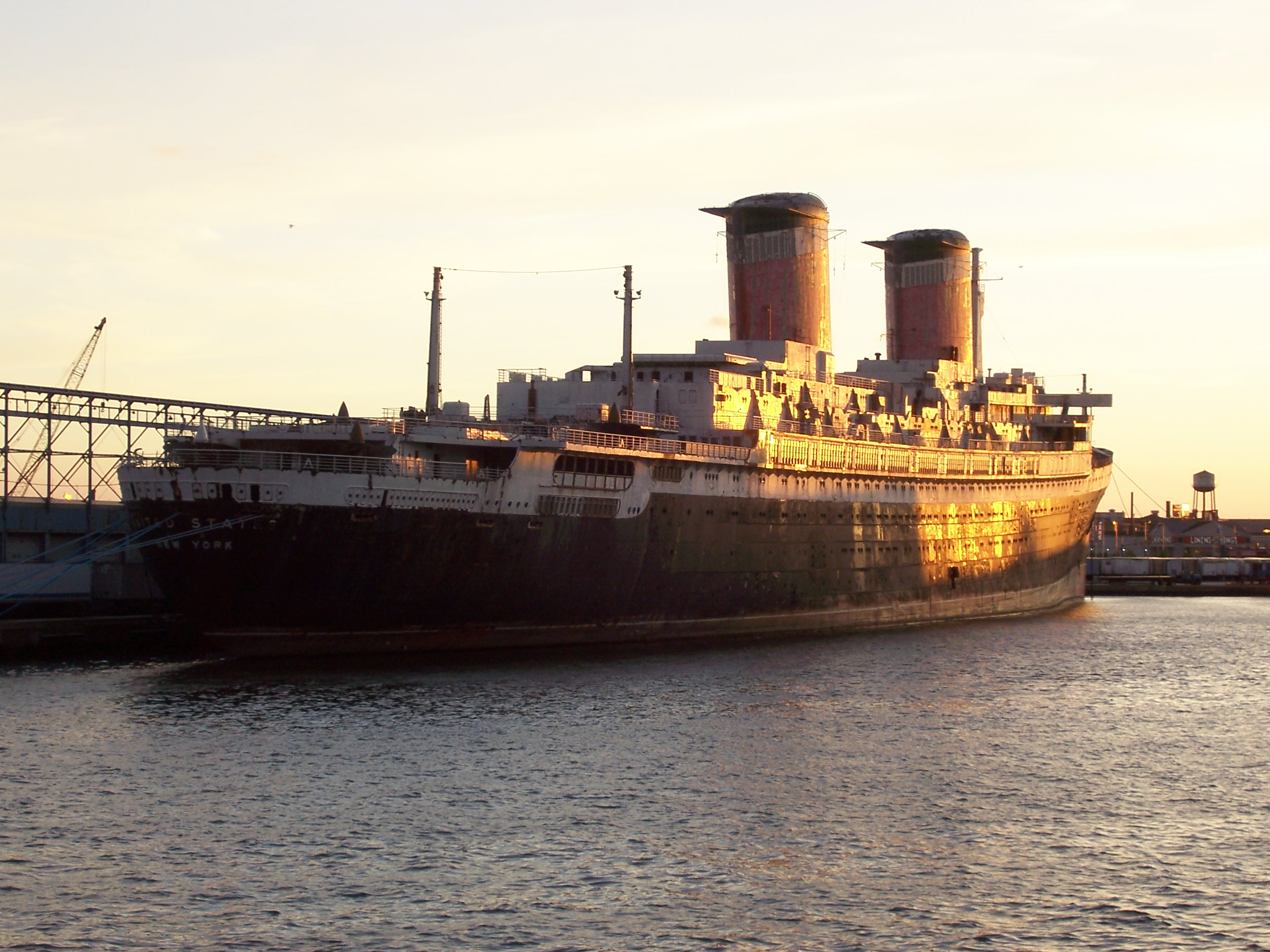
SS United States laid up in Pier 82, Philadelphia, 2006

In 2003, Norwegian Cruise Line (NCL) purchased the ship at auction from Cantor's estate after his death. NCL intended to restore the ship to service for NCL America, a newly announced, American-flagged, Hawaiian passenger service. United States was one of the few suitable ships for such service because of the Passenger Service Act, which requires any vessel that is engaged in domestic commerce to be built and flagged in the US, and operated by a mostly American crew. In late 2003, NCL began an extensive technical review that found the ship was in sound condition, and cataloged over 100 boxes of the ship's blueprints. In August 2004, NCL commenced feasibility studies for retrofitting the vessel, and in 2006, company owner Tan Sri Lim Kok Thay stated United States would be retrofitted.

By 2009, due to the aftershocks of the Great Recession, NCL changed its plans for United States, which was costing the company about $800,000 yearly to keep afloat and redundant once Pride of America, Pride of Aloha, and Pride of Hawaii started operating for NCL America. The company began taking bids for the scrapping of United States.

=== SS United States Conservancy (2011–2024) ===
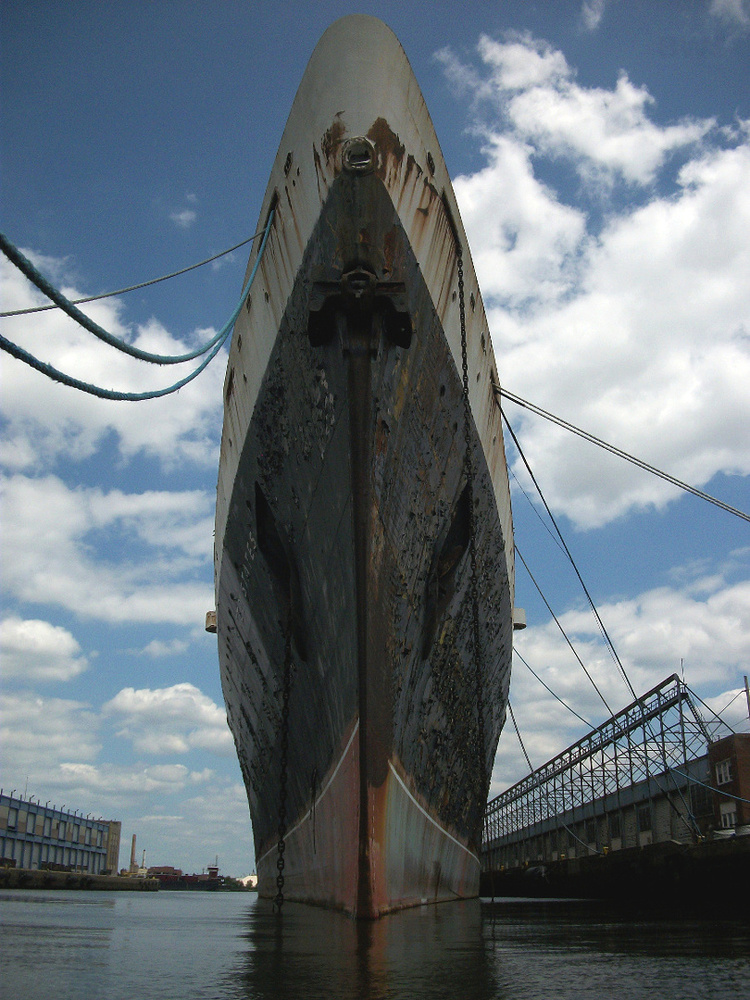
The bow of the SS United States, 2017

In 2009, the SS United States Conservancy was formed to save the ship by raising funds to purchase her. On July 30, 2009, H. F. Lenfest, a Philadelphia media entrepreneur and philanthropist, pledged a matching grant of $300,000 to help the Conservancy purchase the vessel from NCL's parent company. While Lenfest, a former US Navy captain, did not see the project as economically feasible, he was sympathetic to the ship because his father was one of the naval architects who helped build her. The former US president Bill Clinton also endorsed efforts to save the ship, having sailed on her in 1968.

In November 2010, the Conservancy announced a plan to develop a "multi-purpose waterfront complex" with hotels, restaurants, and a casino along the Delaware River in South Philadelphia, at the proposed location of the stalled Foxwoods Casino project. In December that year, a detailed study of the site was revealed in tandem with a plan for Harrah's Entertainment to take over the project. The deal collapsed later that month when the Pennsylvania Gaming Control Board voted to revoke the casino's license.

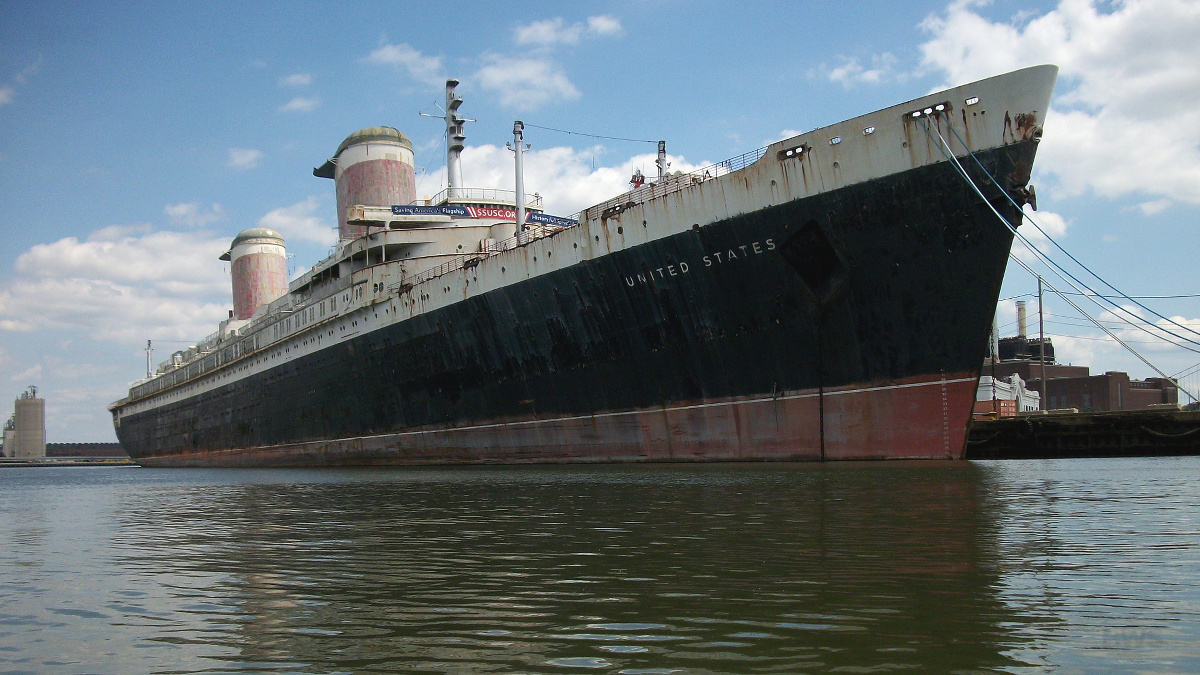
SS United States docked at Pier 82 in Christopher Columbus Boulevard, Philadelphia, on July 16, 2017

The Conservancy bought United States from NCL in February 2011 for a reported $3 million with Lenfest's assistance. The group had funds to last 20 months that went to de-toxification and plans to make the ship financially independent, possibly as a hotel or other development project. Conservancy executive director Dan McSweeney stated that possible locations for the ship included Philadelphia, New York City, and Miami.

On February 1, 2011, The Conservancy assumed ownership of United States. Talks about a location for the ship lasted months. In New York City, negotiations with a developer for the ship to become part of Vision 2020, a $3.3 billion waterfront development, were underway. In Miami, Florida, Ocean Group International was interested in putting the ship in a slip on the north side of American Airlines Arena. With an additional $5.8 million donation from Lenfest, the Conservancy had about 18 months from March 2011 to convert United States into a public attraction. On August 5, 2011, the Conservancy announced after several studies, Philadelphia was "not likely to work there for a variety of reasons". Discussions to locate the ship at New York—her original home port—as a stationary attraction were ongoing.

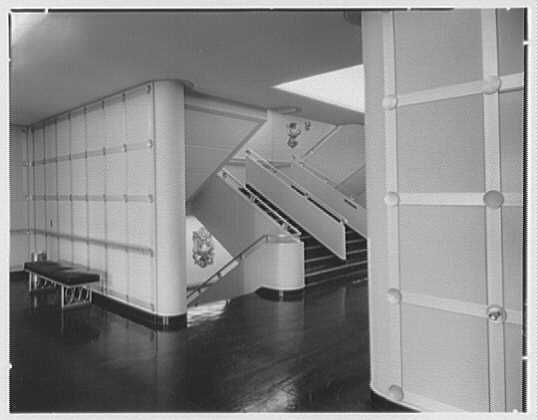
An onboard stairway landing soon after the ship left service

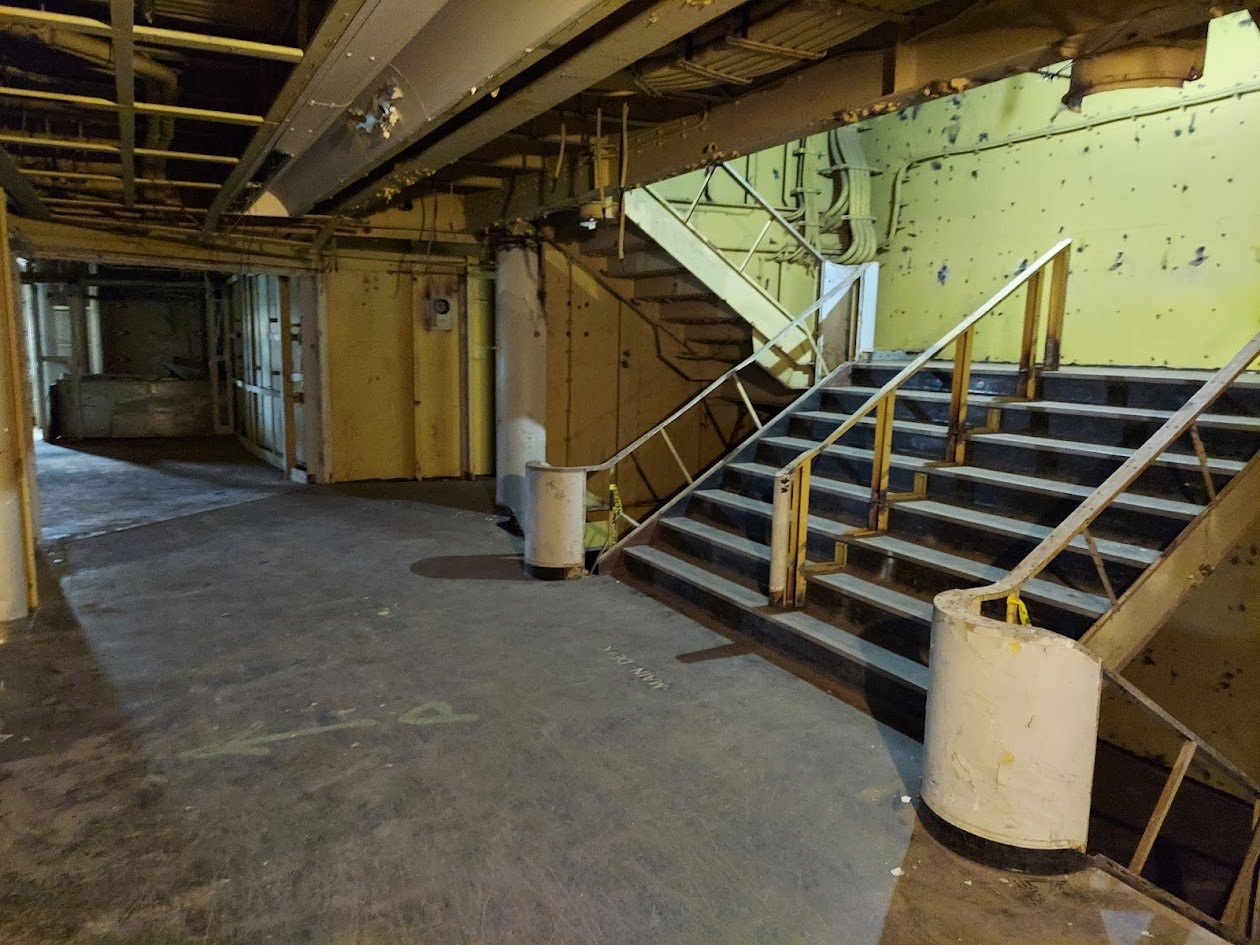
A similar (or the same) landing in 2024 after the interiors were stripped

On February 7, 2012, preliminary restoration work to prepare the ship for a complete reconstruction began, although a contract had not yet been signed. In July 2012, the Conservancy launched a new online campaign called "Save the United States"; it used social networking and micro-fundraising that allowed donors to sponsor square inches of a virtual ship for redevelopment while allowing them to upload photographs and stories about their experience with the ship. The Conservancy announced donors to the virtual ship would be featured in an interactive "Wall of Honor" aboard the future SS United States museum.

A developer that would put United States in a selected city by 2013 was to be chosen by the end of 2012. In November 2012, the ship underwent a months-long "below-the-deck" makeover to make her more appealing to developers as an attraction. The Conservancy was warned the ship may be scrapped if its plans were not quickly realized. In January 2014, obsolete pieces of the ship were sold to pay the $80,000-a-month maintenance costs. Enough money to fund the ship for another six months was raised with the hope of finding someone committed to the project, with New York City remaining the likeliest location.

In August, the ship was still moored in Philadelphia and rent costs were $60,000 a month. It was estimated $1 billion would be needed to return United States to service, although a 2016 estimate for restoration as a luxury cruise ship placed the maximum cost at $700 million. On September 4, 2014, a final effort to have the ship sail to New York City was made. A developer interested in re-purposing the ship as a major waterfront destination made an announcement about the move. The Conservancy had weeks to decide whether to sell the ship for scrap. On December 15, 2014, preliminary agreements in support of the redevelopment of United States were announced. The agreements included the provision of three months of carrying costs, with a timeline and more details to be released in 2015. In February 2015, the Conservancy received another $250,000 toward planning an onboard museum from an anonymous donor.

In October 2015, as the group began to exhaust funds, the Conservancy explored potential bids to scrap United States. Attempts to re-purpose the ship continued; ideas for reuse included hotels, restaurants, and office space. One idea was to install computer servers in the lower decks and link them to software development businesses in office space on the upper decks. No firm plans were announced. The Conservancy said if no progress was made by October 31, 2015, they would be forced to sell the ship to a "responsible recycler". As the deadline passed, it was announced $100,000 had been raised in October 2015, sparing the ship from immediate danger. By November 23, 2015, it was reported over $600,000 in donations had been received for care and upkeep, providing funding well into 2016 for the Conservancy to continue with its plan to redevelop the vessel.

==== Crystal Cruises (2016–2018) ====
On February 4, 2016, Crystal Cruises announced it had signed a purchase option for redevelopment of the United States. The company paid the ship's docking costs for nine months while it conducted a feasibility study on returning the ship to service as a cruise ship based in New York City. On April 9, 2016, it was announced 600 artifacts from United States would be returned to the ship from the Mariners' Museum and other donors.

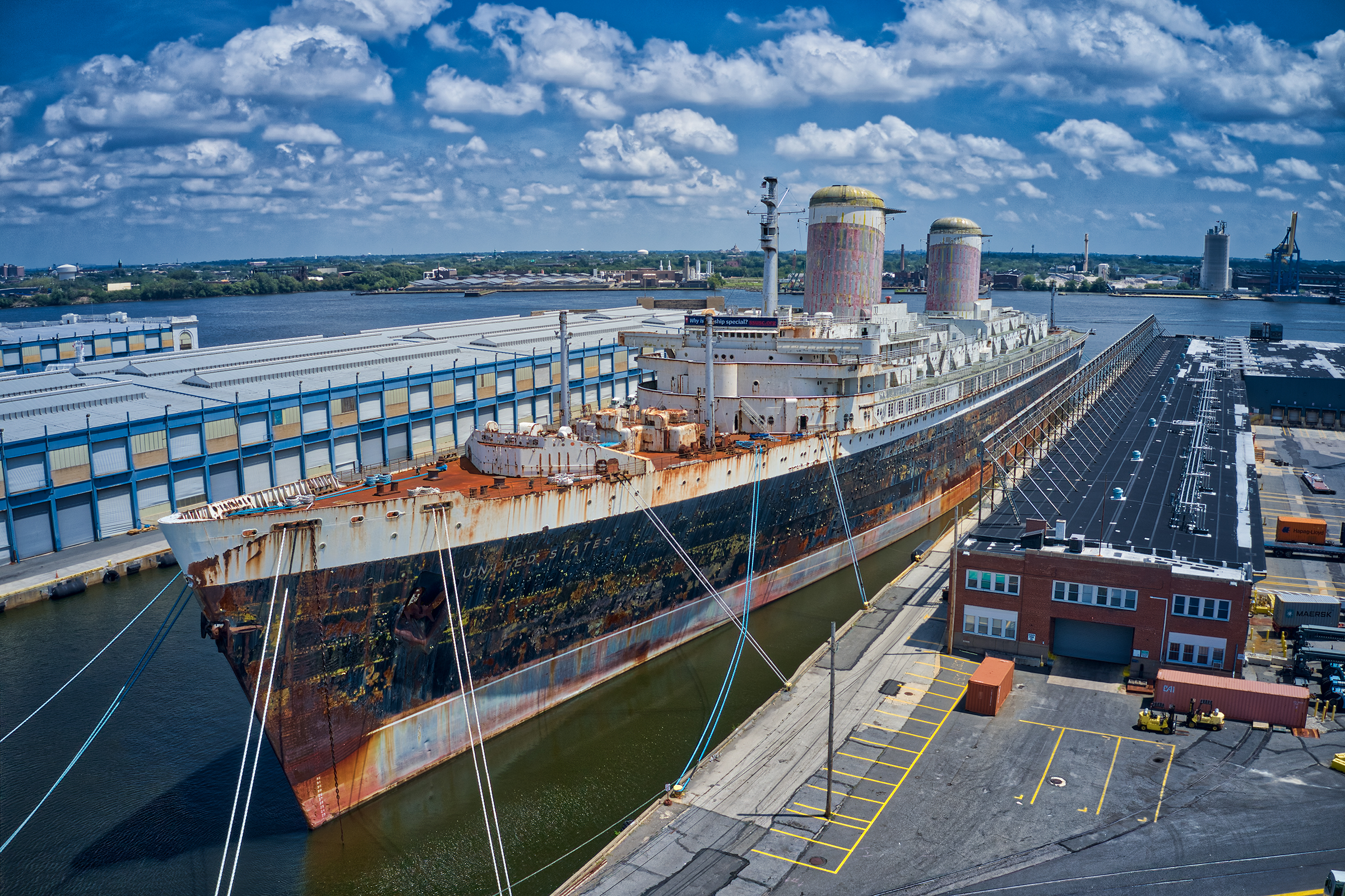
Drone photo of SS United States on August 2, 2020

On August 5, 2016, the plan was abandoned; Crystal Cruises cited the project's technical and commercial challenges, and donated $350,000 to help preservation effort until the end of the year. The Conservancy continued to receive donations, including one for $150,000 from cruise-industry executive Jim Pollin. In January 2018, the Conservancy made an appeal to the US President Donald Trump to take action. In the event it ran out of money, the group made alternative plans for the ship, including sinking her as an artificial reef rather than scrapping her.

On September 20, 2018, the Conservancy consulted with Casper van Hooren and Damen Ship Repair & Conversion about redevelopment of United States. Van Hooren had converted the former ocean liner and cruise ship SS Rotterdam into a hotel and mixed-use development.

==== RXR Realty (2018–2024) ====
On December 10, 2018, the Conservancy announced an agreement with the commercial real estate firm RXR Realty to explore options for restoring and redeveloping United States. The Conservancy required any redevelopment plan to preserve the ship's profile and exterior design, and include approximately 25,000 sq ft (2,323 m^{2}) for an onboard museum. RXR's press release about United States stated multiple locations would be considered, depending on the viability of restoration plans.

In March 2020, RXR Realty announced its plans to repurpose the ship as a permanently moored, 600,000 sq ft (55,740 m^{2}) "hospitality and cultural space", and requested expressions of interest from major US waterfront cities, including Boston, New York, Philadelphia, Miami, Seattle, San Francisco, Los Angeles, and San Diego.

In 2023, RXR Realty and MCR Hotels released a more-detailed plan for the ship's redevelopment into a 1,000-room hotel, museum, event venue, public park, and restaurant. New York City was chosen as the best location for the ship due to existing infrastructure and the nearby Javits Convention Center, and the ship would ideally be moored to a specially built pier along the Hudson River. The 2023 plan document also included several rendered images of the redesigned United States depicting the ship docked along Manhattan's West Side at a public pier in Hudson River Park. One of the ship's funnels, with the top removed and exposed to the sky, would be a key element of the hotel. The funnel would act as a skylight, illuminating the hotel and event spaces. The plan also included hotel rooms held in the lifeboat davits, a swimming pool between the funnels, and an aft-mix interior-exterior ballroom.

==== Pier 82 eviction (2021–2024) ====
Philadelphia's Pier 82, where the ship was located, was owned by Penn Warehousing, which in 2021 increased the ship's rent from $850 to $1,700 per day, requested $160,000 in back rent, and terminated the contract with the Conservancy. The company stated the change was due to the United States slowly damaging the pier and the Conservancy refusing to maintain a previous agreement to cover possible damages. The Conservancy responded by stating the rent hike violated an agreement made in 2011 and refused to pay. They said Penn Warehousing illegally wanted to evict the ship so the pier could be used for more profitable activities. This led to the Conservancy and Penn Warehousing suing each other.

A civil trial took place in federal court from January 17–18, 2024. Judge Anita Brody issued a final judgment on June 14. Brody dismissed Penn Warehousing's financial demands but found because the 2011 berthing agreement was of indefinite duration, it was terminable at will by either party upon reasonable notice. Brody ordered the removal of United States within 90 days (by September 12). With such a tight deadline, the Conservancy was unsure how the liner could be moved or where it could go. Six days later, the Conservancy began a new donation drive and requested $500,000 to help relocate the ship. In August 2024, the Conservancy stated that in addition to necessary surveys, tugboats, insurance, and other preparations, the 2024 Atlantic hurricane season complicated efforts to relocate the ship before the deadline, the main difficulty being finding a port willing to host the ship.

On September 12, 2024, the date on which United States was ordered to be evicted, the Conservancy accused the landlord, Penn Warehousing, of illegally planning to sell the ship. The Conservancy alleged the company had blocked an initial agreement, then planned to seize the ship and sell her for profit, thus extorting the non-profit and buyer out of millions of dollars. The Conservancy took the issue back to court and demanded an extension to the eviction notice.

In court, the eviction deadline was temporarily suspended. The company defended itself, saying it added $3 million to the sale of United States because she had not vacated her berth before the deadline. Blame was placed on the buyers for not responding to the company, with the ship's sale now under the judge's supervision. The company stated it wanted to remove the ship, so that the pier could be used to support the local economy.

=== 2024 images ===
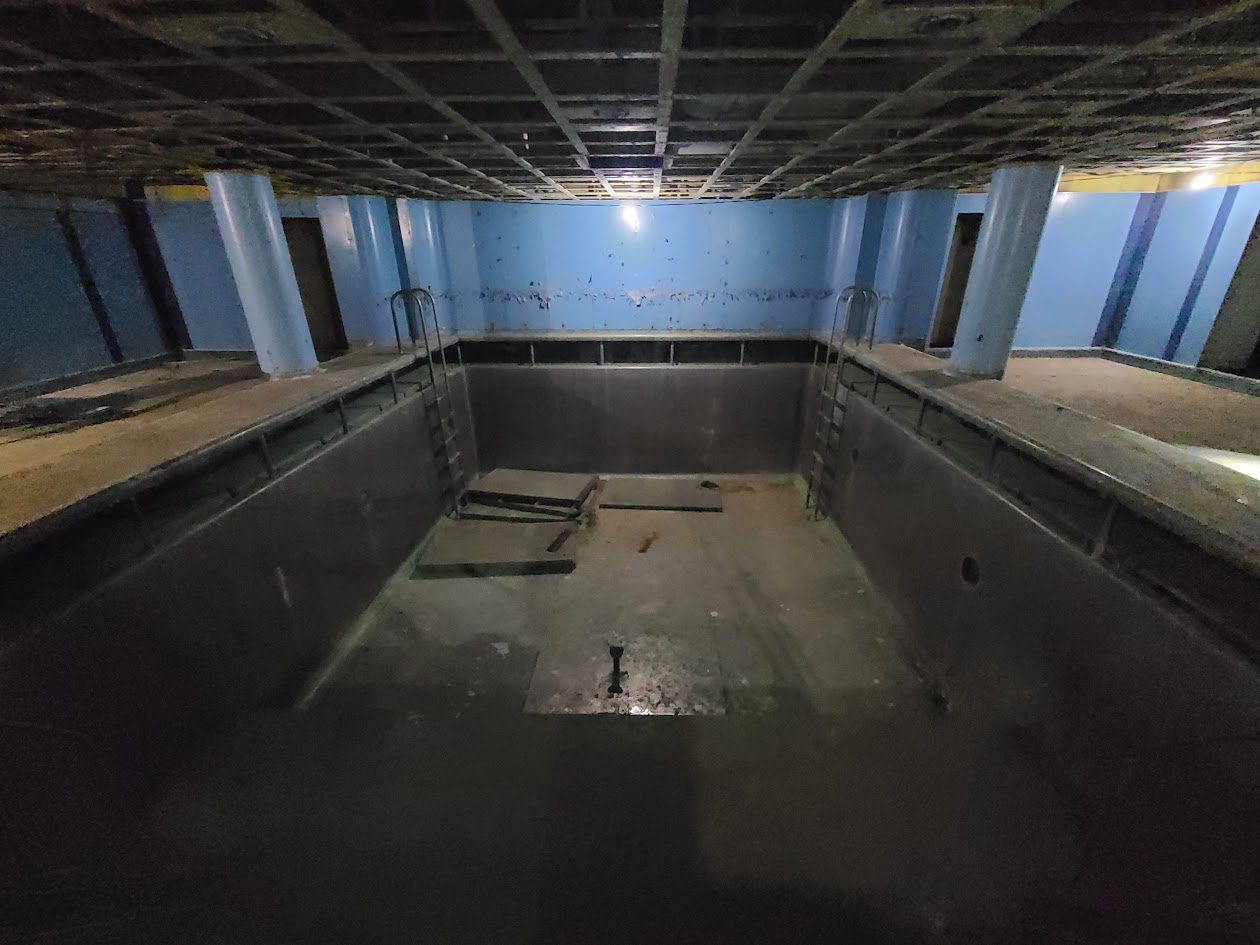
The ship's drained swimming pool

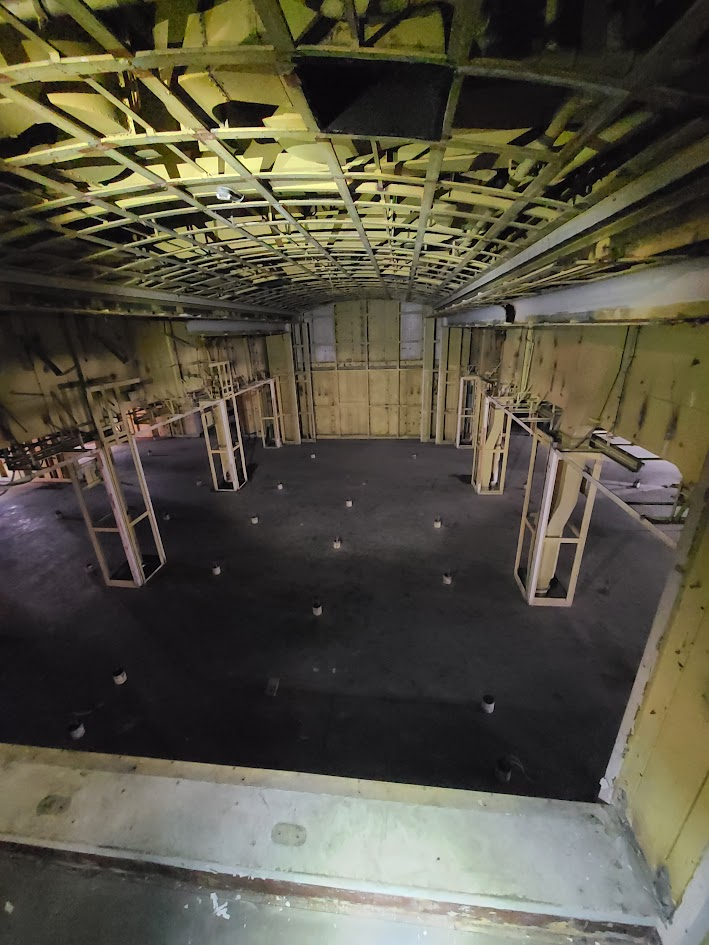
The Minstrel's Gallery, looking down onto the first-class dining room one deck below

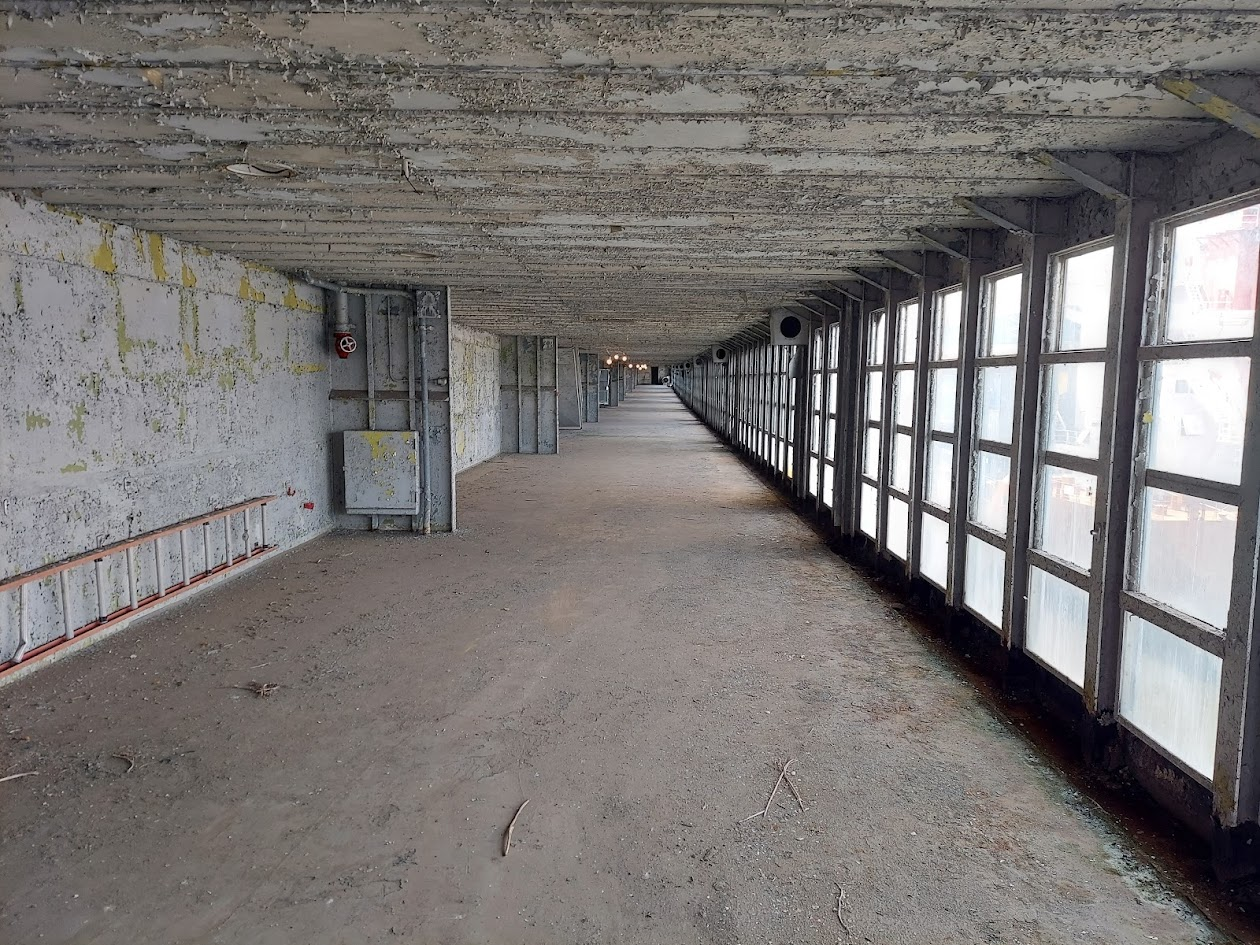
The 1st-class enclosed promenade, which runs for most of the ship's length

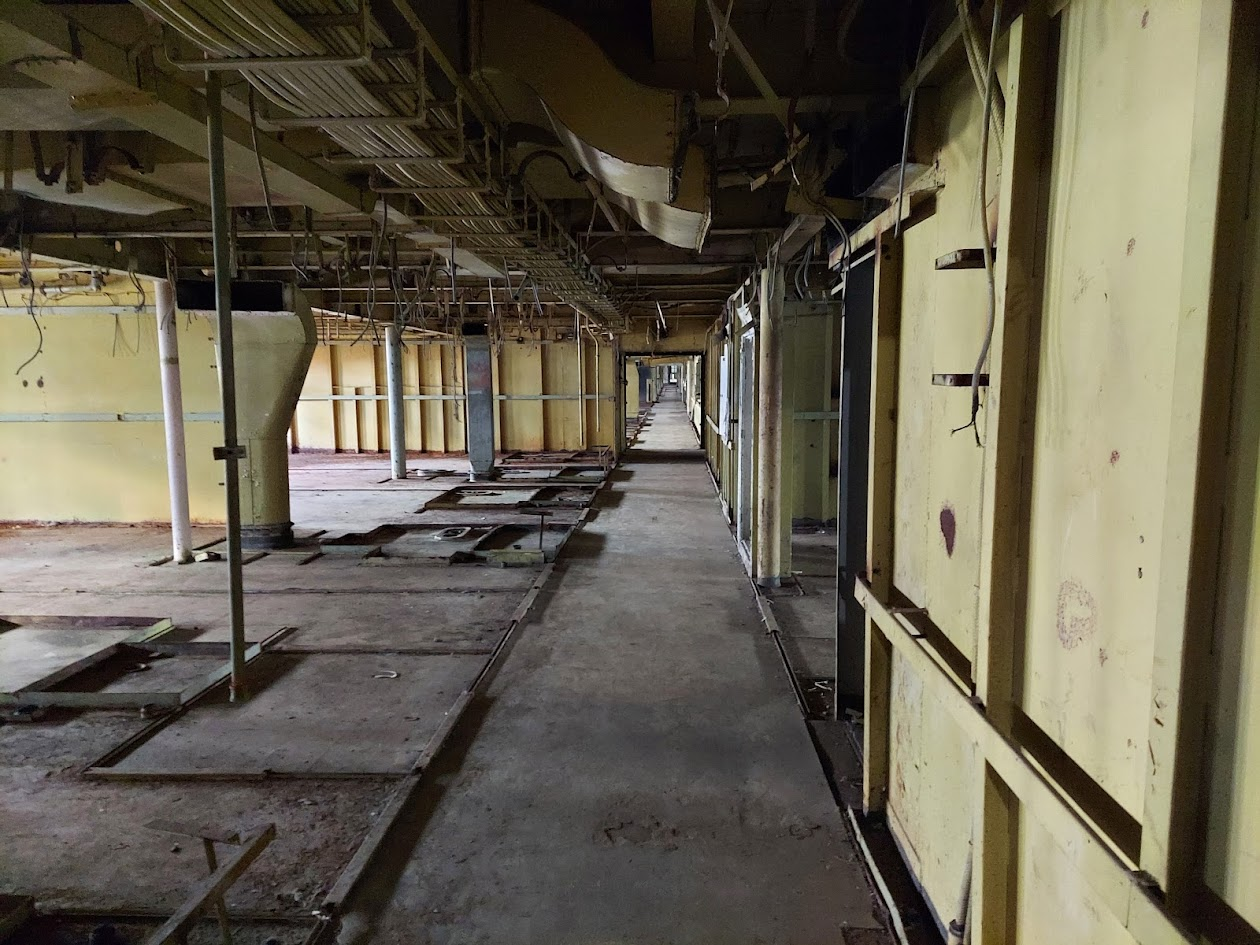
A passageway with the footprint of first-class staterooms on the left

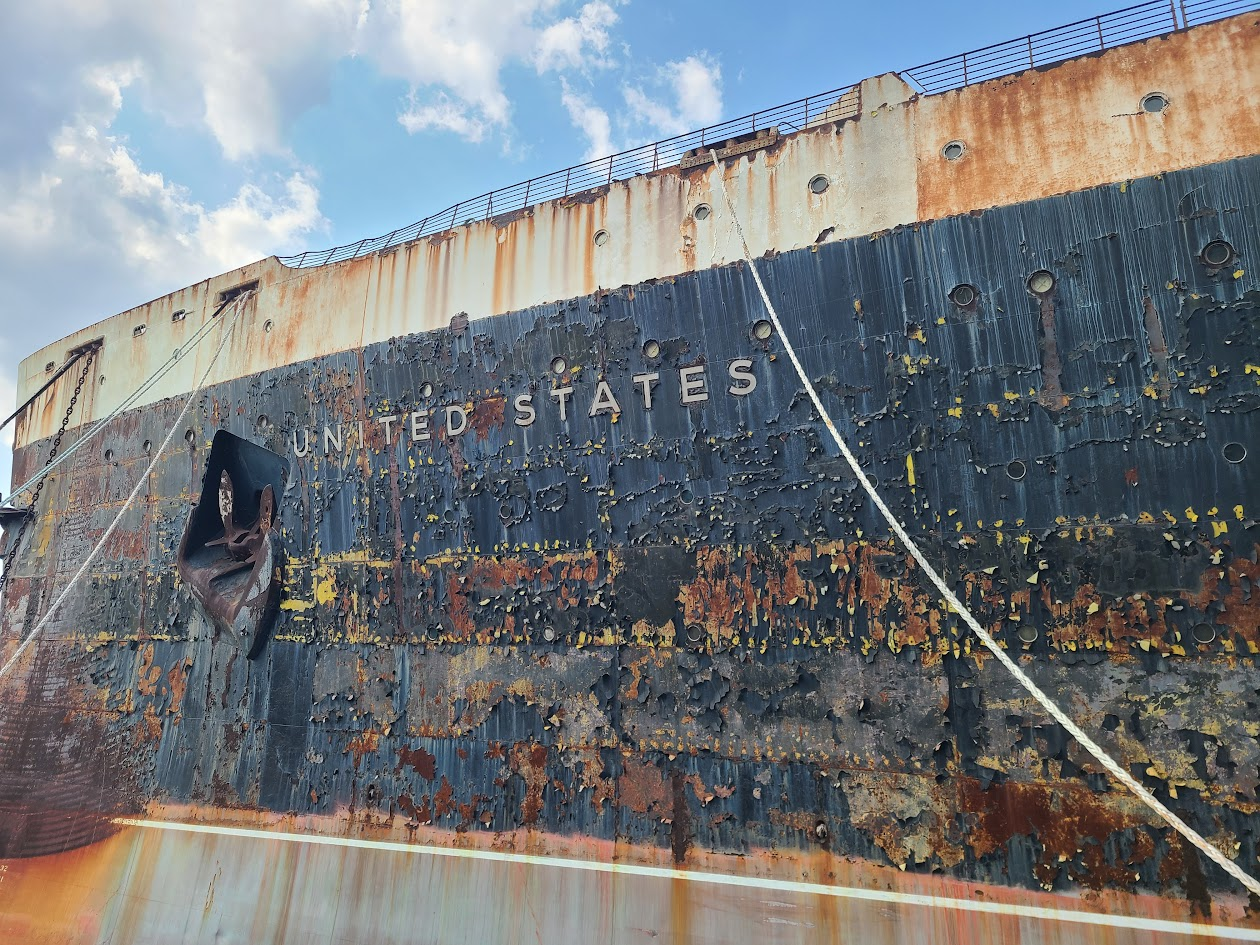
The rusting ship's name and bow

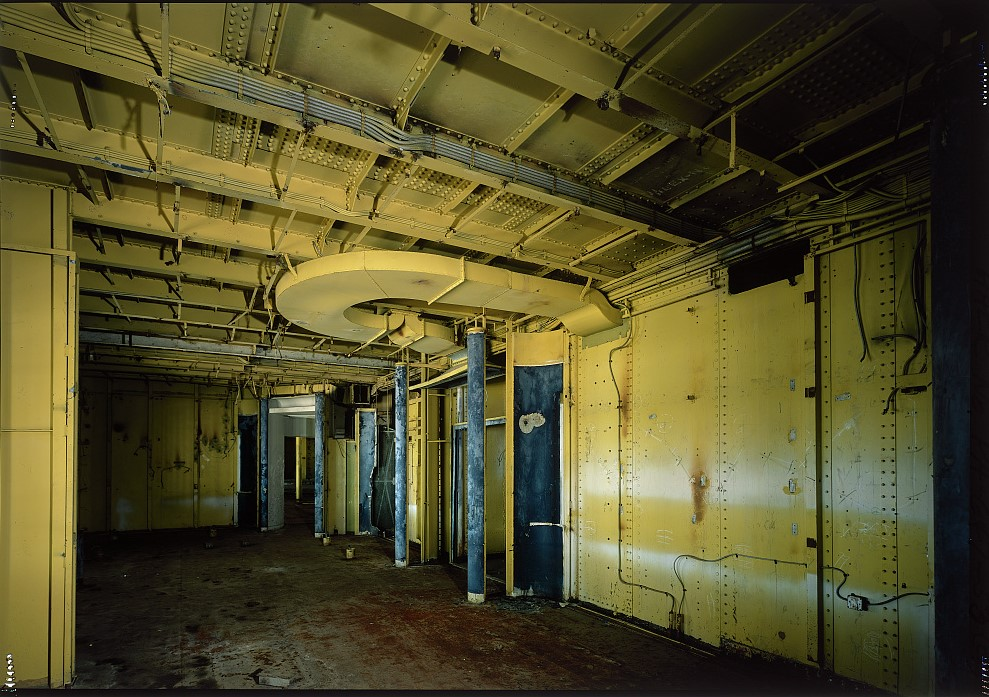
The ship's first-class restaurant, stripped of asbestos and furnishings.

== Conversion to artificial reef (2024–2026) ==
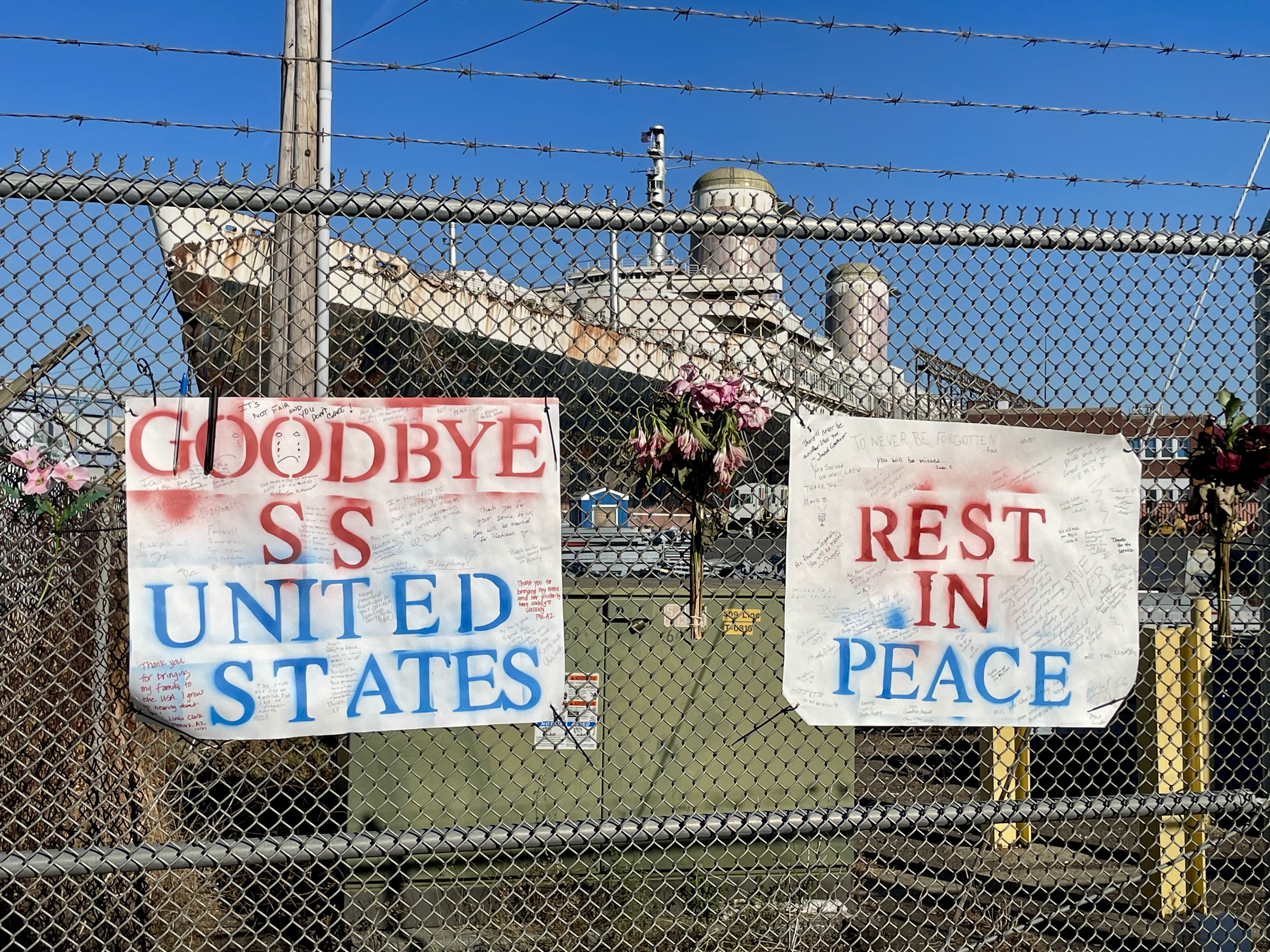
Signs expressing sadness over the ship's imminent departure in late 2024

=== Okaloosa County, Florida ===
On August 30, 2024, Florida's Okaloosa County announced its plan to buy United States and sink her as the world's largest artificial reef off Destin-Fort Walton beach at a cost of $1 million. The county identified several inshore locations, hoping tourism and diving expeditions would bring in revenue to pay for the project. Escambia County had sunk the aircraft carrier USS Oriskany in 2006 as part of a similar plan. The same day, the Conservancy said the agreement with Okaloosa County was a contingent contract and would only proceed if the Conservancy had no other options to keep the ship afloat. It would be enacted in the event no alternatives be found before the eviction deadline.

In October 2024, Okaloosa County purchased the ship for $1 million. The county estimated that the project would take about 18 months and $10 million after judge approval. To prepare the ship to be sunk as an artificial reef, she would first be relocated to Mobile, Alabama, to be prepared for scuttling, before finally arriving in Destin-Fort Walton Beach, Florida.

Alongside the artificial reef, the SS United States Conservancy also plans to open a land-based museum. The museum will include ship artifacts, fixtures, furnishings, vintage audio-visual material, and archival documentation collected over the years. Salvaged items from the ship will include her radar mast and both funnels.

In response to Okaloosa County's plans to sink the ship, the New York Coalition to Save the SS United States, a nonprofit organization, was formed in an attempt to try and save the ship. On March 2, 2025, the Coalition filed a federal complaint against Okaloosa County, which was dismissed by the judge on August 6. As of January 2026, the Coalition had a petition with over 15,500 signatures. In addition, on December 18, 2025, the New York City Council unanimously passed Resolution 0649, sponsored by council member Gale Brewer, calling on the federal government to prevent the sinking of United States.

=== Relocation to Mobile, Alabama ===
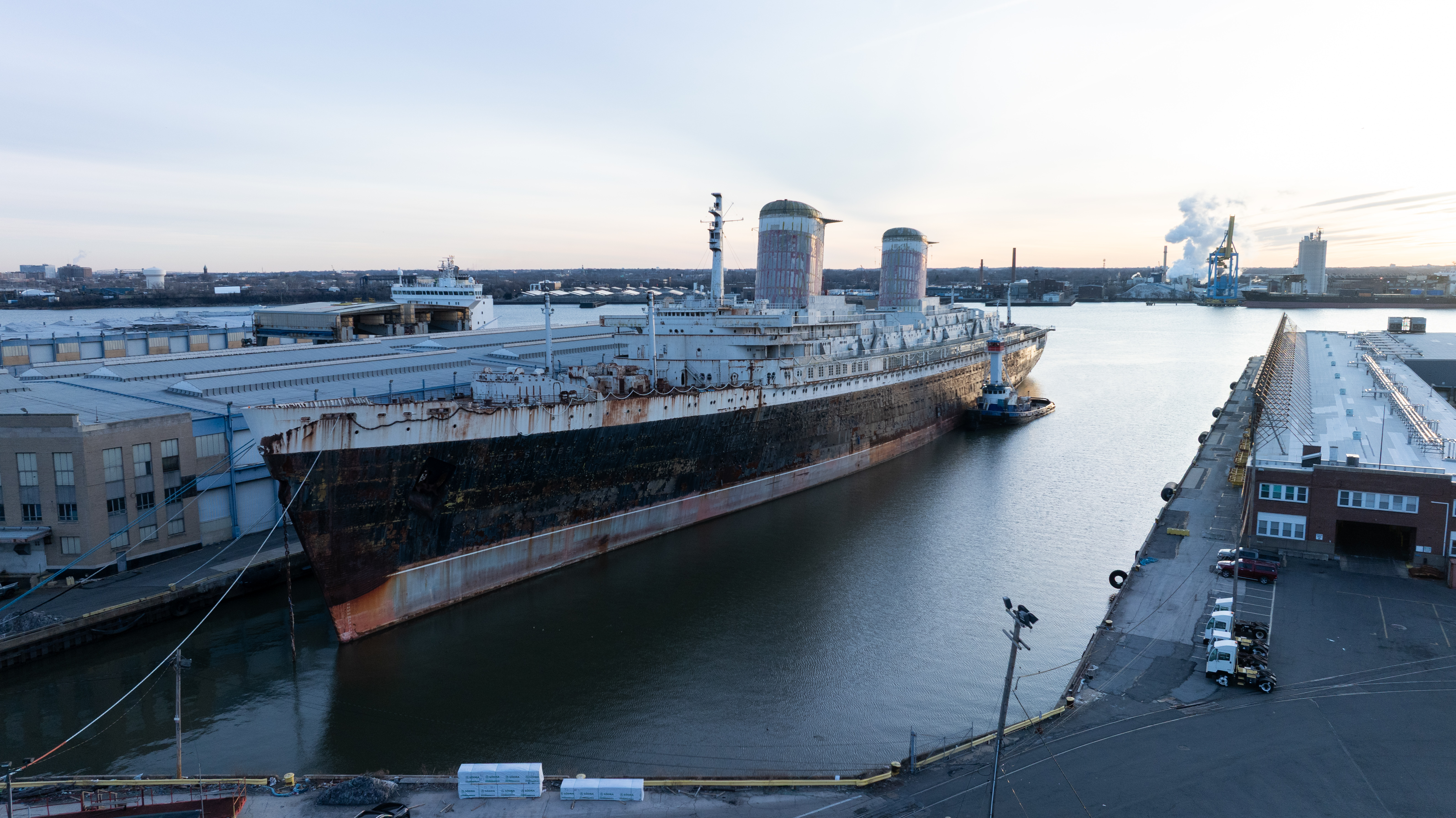
SS United States, during its last day at Philadelphia's Pier 80 – February 19, 2025

The US Coast Guard refused to allow the liner to be moved until it could verify her structural integrity and ensure the ship would not sink during transit or pose a risk to wildlife. A move announced for February 8, 2025, was canceled due to this request. The liner was successfully shifted between Piers 82 and 80 on February 14, 2025. The ship could only be moved out of its berth at high tide due to an accumulation of silt. Another move scheduled for February 17, 2025, was also canceled due to severe weather.

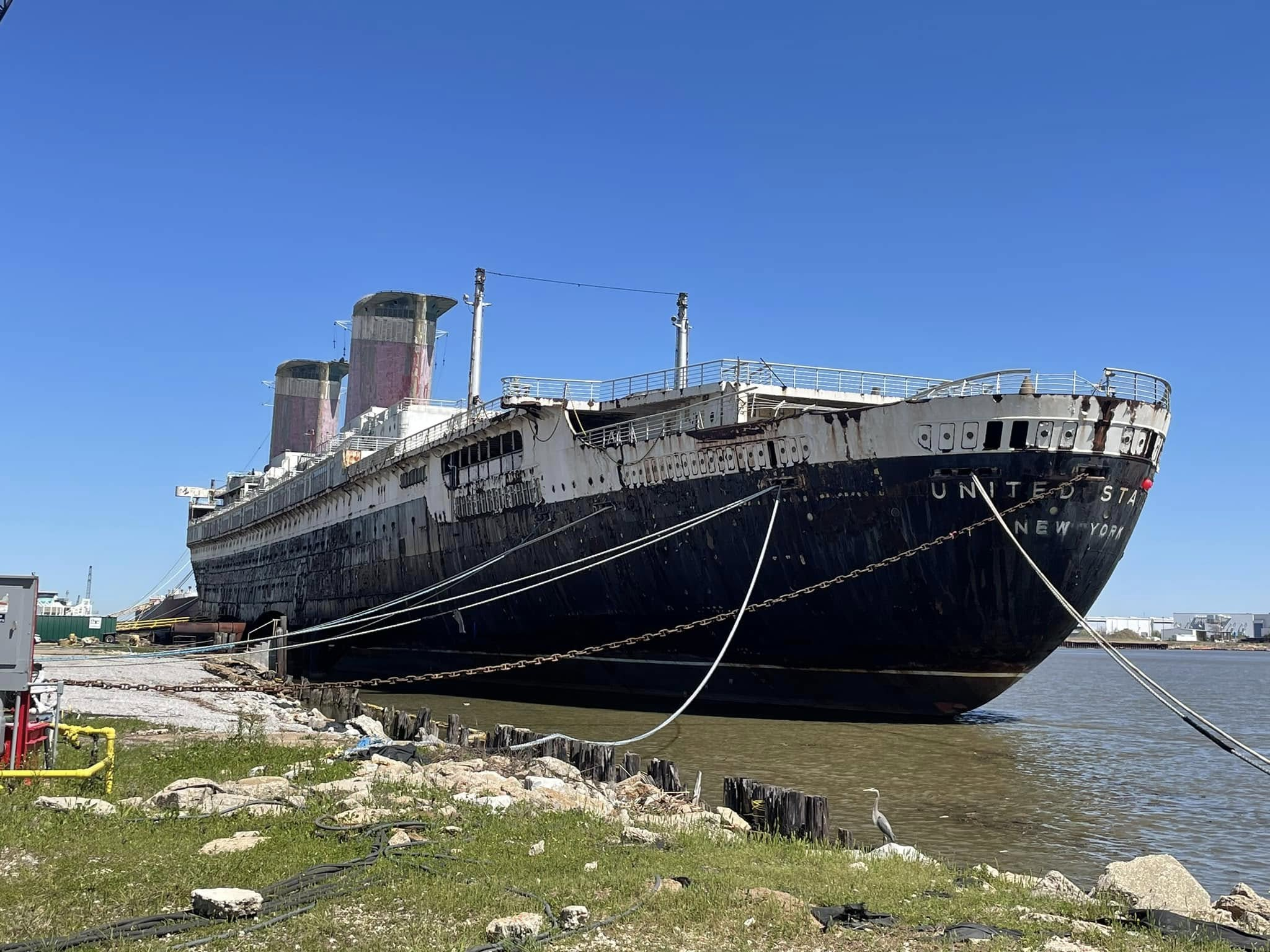
United States docked in Mobile, Alabama, March 17, 2025

On February 19, 2025, the ship began its journey to Mobile, Alabama. United States departed Pier 80 at approximately noon EST, propelled by tug boats. Local interest and its prominent location along the Philadelphia waterfront prompted officials to close traffic on major bridges while the ship passed below. The ship arrived in Mobile on March 3, 2025, two days ahead of schedule. While in Mobile, the ship underwent an extensive remediation process. Items such as environmentally unsafe materials, non-metal items, wiring, command bridge components, engine room equipment, cables, loose items, flooring, furnishings, fuel, paint, and contaminants possibly including asbestos, were removed from the vessel before it was taken to Florida. Preparation also opened passages to allow marine life to thrive in and around the ship, and strategically cut holes to ensure the ship would land upright when submerged. In the lead up to the planned deployment date, underwater mapping company Reef Smart Guides was tasked with creating a photogrammetric 3D model of the ship from aerial drone footage, in order to preserve the ship forever as a publicly available digital twin.

According to Okaloosa County, the ship's final resting place would be 22 nautical miles (25 mi; 41 km) southwest of Destin, 32 nautical miles (37 mi; 59 km) southeast of Pensacola, or about 12 nautical miles (14 mi; 22 km) from USS Oriskany. On August 4, 2025, the forward funnel (which is 65 feet tall) and the ship's radar mast were removed from the ship in order for them to be restored for use as part of the SS United States Conservancy's land-based museum. The museum was originally planned to also make use of a large part of the bridge, but those plans were later scrapped. The aft funnel was removed on August 8. As of October 12, 2025, all fuel, portholes, and windows had been removed. 70% of the wiring had been removed and the top four decks were fully remediated and ready for inspection. In February 2026, county officials announced plans to scuttle the ship in April 2026, but warned that inspections and weather could delay plans. Deployment of the ship was delayed from May to June 2026. In late October 2026, her sinking was announced to occur on November 12.

United States under tow to its reefing location, November 10, 2026

As the ship was being prepared to be sunk, the SS United States Preservation Foundation filed a lawsuit in the United States District Court of Northern Florida against the United States Army Corps of Engineers and Okaloosa County on November 3, 2026. The reasons cited for the lawsuit were environmental hazards, specifically toxic paint, as well as violations of the National Historic Preservation Act. The next day, the lawsuit was followed by an emergency motion for a injunction and temporary restraining order to prevent the ship from leaving Mobile. On November 7, judge M. Casey Rodgers dismissed the lawsuit without prejudice and denied the restraining order after failing to provide an adequate financial security bond and overall lack of verified evidence, giving approval for the reefing to go forward. On November 9, 2026, SS United States departed Mobile for its designated reefing location. That same day, Okaloosa County announced that it would sink the ship on November 11 instead of November 12 due to wind concerns.

=== Sinking ===
United States having rolled onto its port side, less than two minutes before the ship's final plunge

United States during its final plunge, right before disappearing into the Gulf of Mexico

SS United States arrived at its reefing location on November 10, with final preparations being made that day. On November 11, after the sinking was delayed for a second time from its original time of 1:00 pm CST, the Pensacola News Journal reported at approximately 1:36 pm CST that a Fort Walton Beach Fire Department fire boat had begun to pump water into the ship, beginning the process of scuttling. At 4:50 pm CST, officials reported that two valves that allow seawater to flow into the ship had been opened, and that the "process toward final descent" had begun. At 5:47 pm CST, all remaining valves were opened, and the remaining crew members departed the ship. But progress remained very slow.

The crew of the tug Isabelle, who had towed the ship to her sinking site the day prior and had remained next to her to avoid drifting of the hull, began running their engines forwards in an attempt to assist the ship with the reefing process by pushing her gangway doors into the ocean. After 7 hours and 9 minutes of flooding, at 8:45 pm CST, all nearby crafts and the tug were ordered to stand clear as the ship suddenly developed a severe port list and capsized over the course of fifteen minutes and sank stern-first at 9:00 pm CST. She now lies approximately 180 feet (55 m) deep, with her top deck 60 feet (18 m) below the ocean's surface, readily accessible even for inexperienced divers.

On the morning of November 12, despite the orientation in which the ship sank, Okaloosa County officials confirmed that sonar imaging indicated the ship had landed upright on the sea floor as planned. Later that afternoon, divers from the RV Explorer released an image of the ship's stern, further confirming the ship was upright with near-zero damage aside from slight buckling of the stern visible in footage taken near the aft cargo doors. On November 13, the wreck was opened to commercial diving after initial inspections the previous day had been completed. The development of marine ecology on the wreck is expected to happen naturally in multiple stages over many years; first biofilm, then shellfish and hard corals, then small fish, and eventually larger fish.

== Artifacts ==
=== Artwork ===
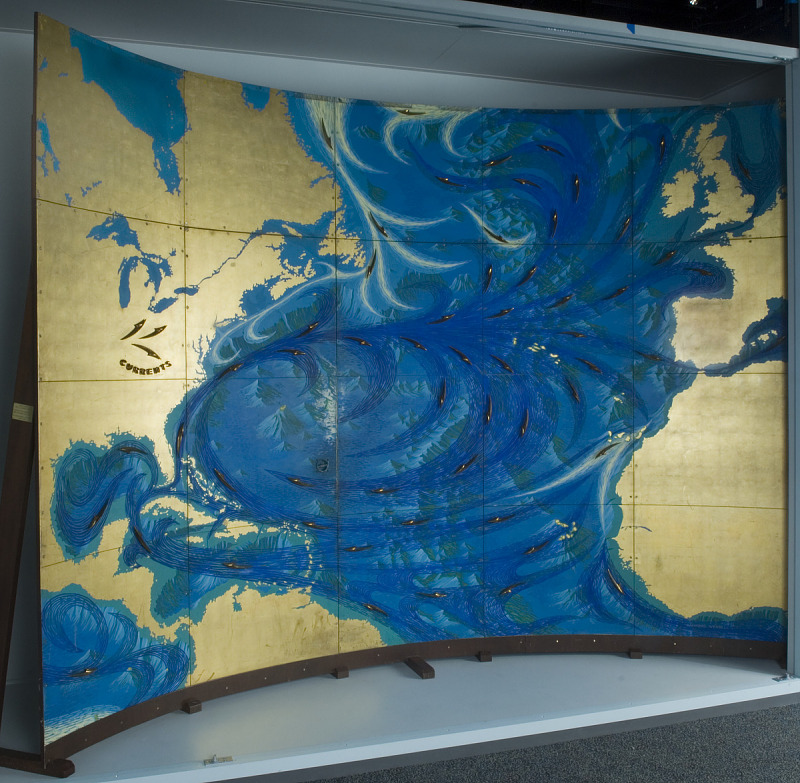
The Currents, a painted mural originally for United States displayed at the Smithsonian Institution

The Mariners' Museum of Newport News holds many objects from United States, including Expressions of Freedom by Gwen Lux, a main-dining-room sculpture it purchased during the 1984 auction. Celebrity Cruises purchased artworks designed by Charles Gilbert, including glass panels etched with sea creatures from the first-class ballroom, and incorporated them into the United States-themed restaurant aboard Infinity. Other onboard memorabilia, including original porcelain and a ship model, were moved to the entrance of the ship's casino in 2015. At the National Museum of American History, the mural The Currents by Raymond John Wendell is on display. The museum also bought two murals by Hildreth Meière—Mississippi and Father of Waters—but these are not on display.

=== Propellers and fittings ===
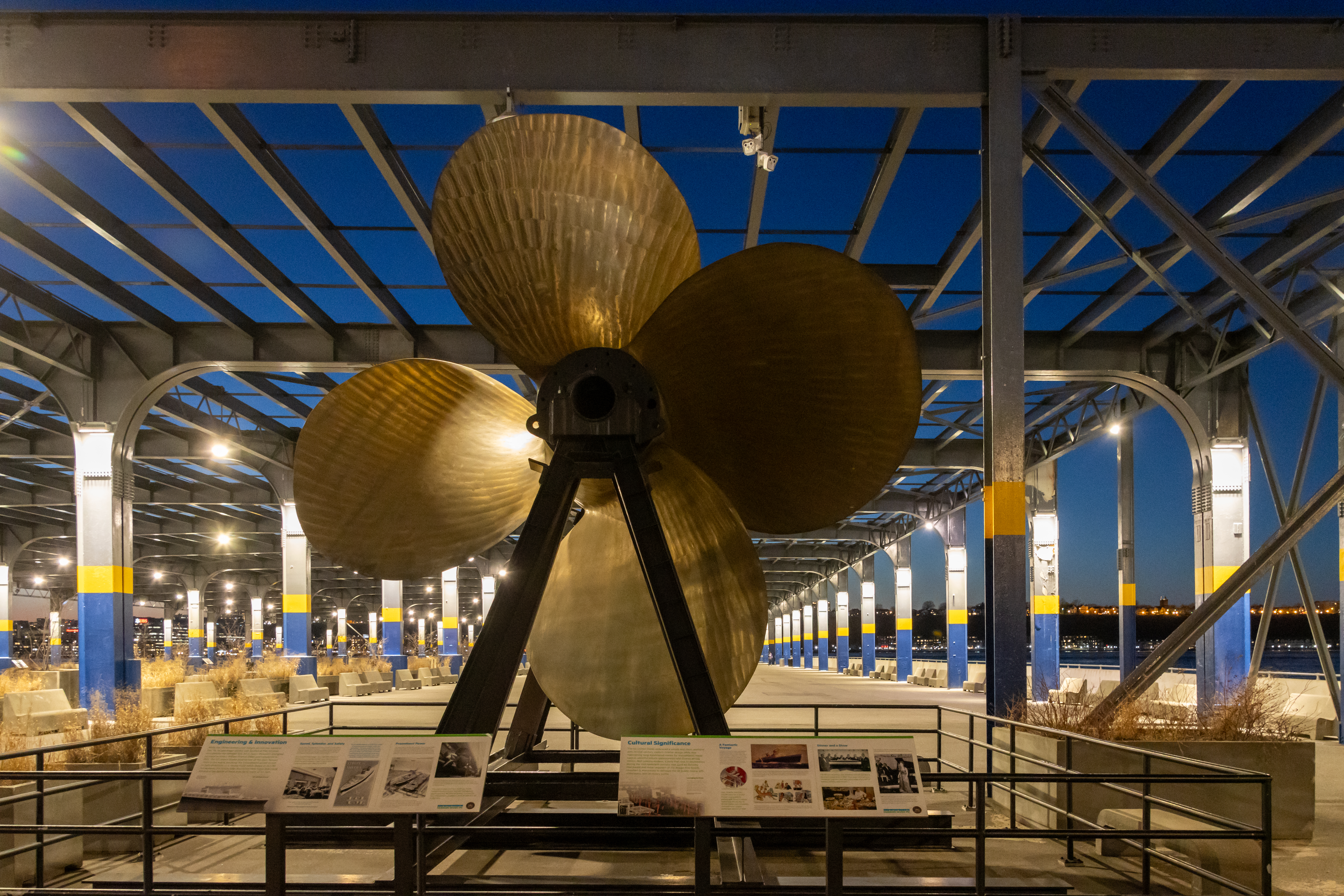
Four-bladed propeller on display outside Pier 76, New York

The United States carried two five-bladed propellers and two four-bladed ones. One of the four-bladed propellers is mounted at Pier 76 in New York City and the other is mounted outside the American Merchant Marine Museum at the United States Merchant Marine Academy in Kings Point, New York. The starboard-side five-bladed propeller is mounted near the waterfront at SUNY Maritime College in Fort Schuyler, New York, while the port side five-bladed propeller is fitted on an original 63 ft (19 m) long drive shaft at the entrance of the Mariner's Museum in Newport News, Virginia. A third five-bladed propeller was aboard the ship when she was moved to Mobile and will be preserved in the museum.

The ship's bell, which is kept in a clock tower on the campus of Christopher Newport University in Newport News, Virginia, is used to celebrate special events, and is rung by incoming freshmen and by outgoing graduates. One of the ship's horns that stood on display for decades above a hardware store in Revere, Massachusetts, was sold to a private collector in Texas for $8,000 in 2017. A large collection of dining-room furniture and other memorabilia from United States that had been purchased at the 1984 auction was incorporated at Windmill Point Restaurant in Nags Head, North Carolina. Following the restaurant's closure, the items were donated to the Mariners' Museum and Christopher Newport University in 2007.

== Speed records ==
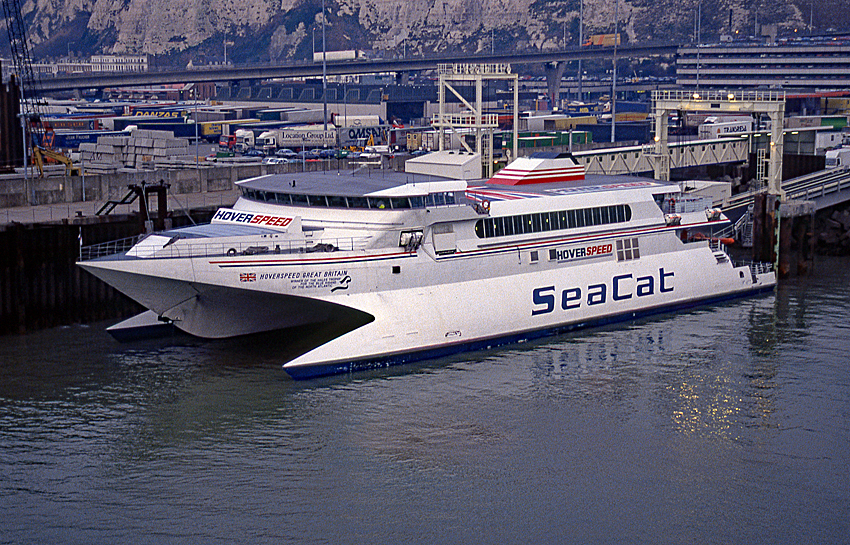
Hoverspeed Great Britain, which won the Hales Trophy from United States

With both the eastbound and westbound speed records, SS United States obtained the Blue Riband in 1952, which marked the first time a US-flagged ship had held the record since SS Baltic claimed the prize 100 years earlier. During her 17 years of service, United States maintained a crossing speed of 35 knots (65 km/h; 40 mph) in the North Atlantic, where she was unchallenged. Due to the decline of ocean liners during the 1960s, many regard the Blue Riband as having ended with United States.

United States' east-bound record was broken several times, first in 1986 by Virgin Atlantic Challenger II, and her west-bound record was broken in 1990 by Destriero, but these vessels were not passenger-carrying ocean liners. The Hales Trophy was lost in 1990 to Hoverspeed Great Britain, which set a new eastbound speed record for a commercial vessel.

== In film and literature ==
Due to her association with luxury and fame, several movies have prominently featured United States during her time in and out of service. The ship is a major plot point in films such as Gentlemen Prefer Blondes (1953), Gentlemen Marry Brunettes (1955), Bon Voyage! (1962), and Munster, Go Home! (1966). More recently, she was used as a set for and appeared in the thriller Dead Man Down (2013) while docked in Philadelphia. Numerous documentaries about the ship have been made, such as SS United States: Lady in Waiting, SS United States: Made in America, and The SS United States: From Dream to Reality. She also appears in the opening sequence of West Side Story (1961).

The 2012 book A Man and His Ship: America's Greatest Naval Architect and His Quest to Build the SS United States by Steven Ujifusa covered the design and construction of the ship. The Wall Street Journal's books editors later named it one of their best non-fiction books of the year.

== See also ==
- John W. Anderson and Commodore Harry Manning, captains of United States

=== Other US passenger ships ===
- SS America (1939)
- SS Leviathan
- SS California (1927)
- SS Virginia (1928)
- SS Pennsylvania (1929)
- SS Manhattan (1931)
- SS Washington (1932)
- SS Santa Rosa (1958)
- MS Pride of America (2002)

=== Restored ocean liners ===
- MV Minghua
- SS Doulos Phos
- SS Hikawa Maru

== Bibliography ==
- Billings, Henry (1953). Superliner S.S. United States. New York: The Viking Press.
- Braynard, Frank O. (2011) [1981]. The Big Ship: The Story of the S.S. United States (New ed.). New York: Turner. ISBN 978-1-59652-764-5. OCLC 745439004.
- Braynard, Frank; Westover, Robert Hudson (2002). S.S. United States: Fastest Ship in the World. Nashville, Tennessee: Turner Publishing. ISBN 1-56311-824-6.
- Britton, Andrew (2012). SS United States. Stroud: The History Press. ISBN 978-0-7524-7953-8.
- Driscoll, Lawrence M. (2013). The Last Great Race, The S.S. United States and the Blue Riband (1st ed.). Oakland, California: The Glencannon Press. ISBN 978-1-889901-59-6.
- Macaulay, David (2019). Crossing on Time: Steam Engines, Fast Ships, and a Journey to the New World. New York: Roaring Brook Press. ISBN 978-1-59643-477-6.
- Maxtone-Graham, John (2014). SS United States: Red, White, and Blue Riband, Forever (1st ed.). New York: W.W. Norton & Company. ISBN 978-0-393-24170-9.
- Miller, William H. (1991). S.S. United States: The Story of America's Greatest Ocean Liner. New York: W.W. Norton. ISBN 0-393-03062-8.
- Miller, William H. (2012). Picture History of the SS United States. Mineola, New York: Dover Publications. ISBN 978-0-486-42839-0.
- Miller, William H. (2015). SS United States: Speed Queen of the Seas. Stroud: Amberley Publishing. ISBN 978-1-4456-1079-5.
- Miller, William H. (2022). SS United States: Ship of Power, Might, and Indecision. Stroud: Fonthill Media. ISBN 978-1-62545-115-6.
- Rindfleisch, James (2023). SS United States: An Operational Guide to America's Flagship. Atglen, Pennsylvania: Schiffer. ISBN 978-0-7643-6655-0.
- Streater, Les (2011). SS United States: America's Superliner. Surrey: Maritime Publishing. ISBN 978-0-9531035-6-0.
- Ujifusa, Steven (2013). A Man and His Ship: America's Greatest Naval Architect and His Quest to Build the S.S. United States (Reprint ed.). New York: Simon & Schuster. ISBN 978-1-4516-4509-5.

Records
Preceded by Queen Mary	Holder of the Blue Riband (eastbound record); 1952–present	Succeeded by None
Preceded by Queen Mary	Blue Riband (westbound record); 1952–present	Succeeded by None
Preceded by Normandie	Holder of the Hales Trophy; 1952–1990	Succeeded by Hoverspeed Great Britain
