= Type P3 ship =

Class of American passenger liners

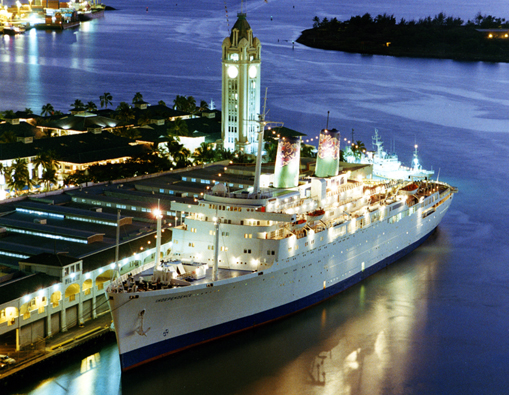
- SS Independence a type P3 ship

Class overview
- Name: type P3 ship
- Builders: Bethlehem Steel Corporation, Quincy, Massachusetts, USA
- Operators: American Export Lines
- Planned: 2
- Completed: 2
- Active: 0
- Laid up: 0
- Lost: 2
- Retired: 2
- Preserved: 0

Type P3 ships were built for the American Export Lines. The two ships in this class are SS Independence and SS Constitution.
