= Fore River Shipyard =

Shipyard in Massachusetts, United States

Coordinates: 42°14′19.75″N 70°58′20.60″W

- "Quincy-built ... The best thing you can say about a ship"

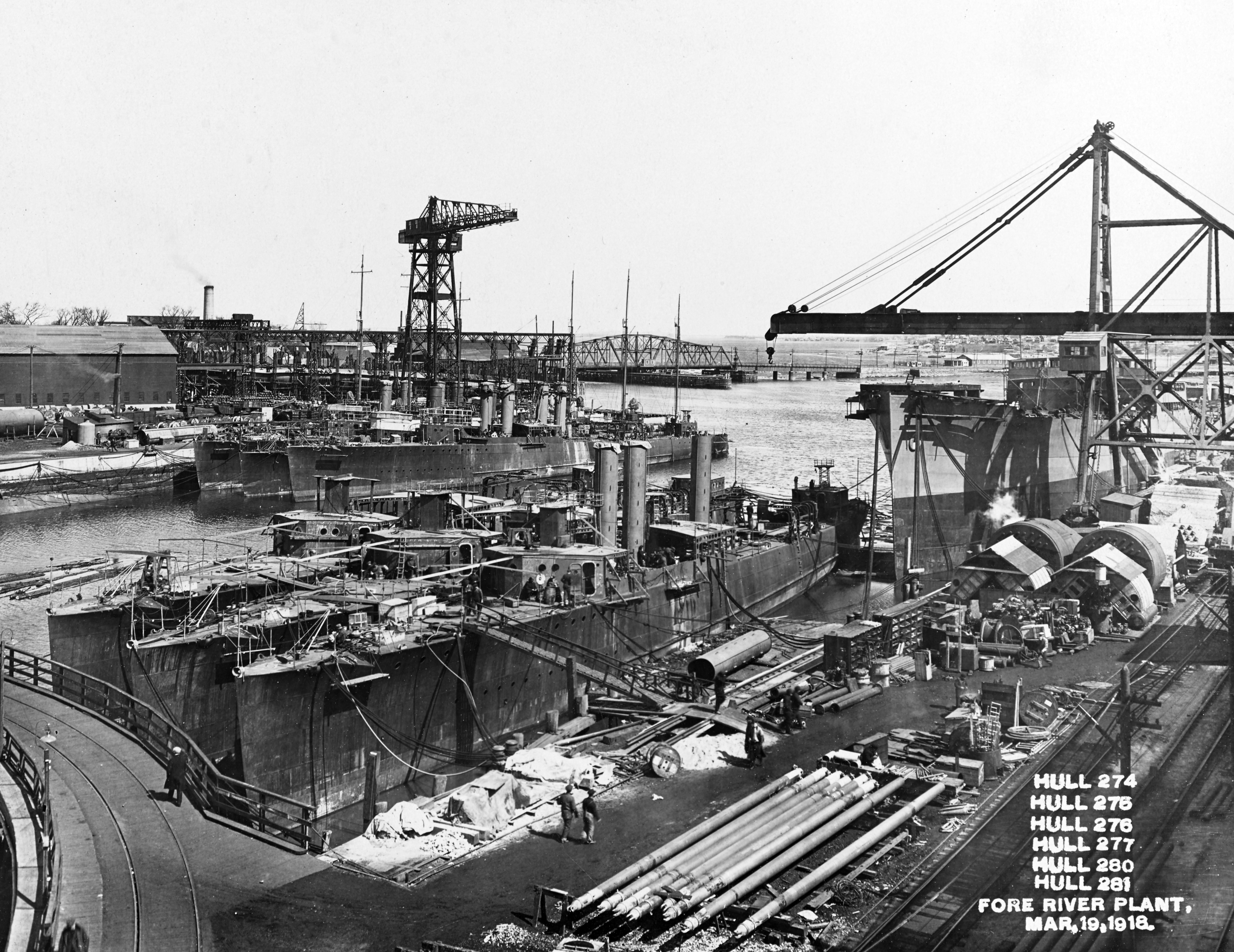
- USS Meade (DD-274), USS Sinclair (DD-275), USS McCawley (DD-276), USS Moody (DD-277), USS Henshaw (DD-278), USS Meyer (DD-279), USS Doyen (DD-280), USS Sharkey (DD-281) and USS Katrina Luckenbach (ID-3020) fitting out at Fore River in 1918
- Trade name: General Dynamics Quincy Shipbuilding Division
- Type: Corporation
- Industry: Shipbuilding
- Predecessor: Fore River Engine Company; Fore River Ship and Engine Company; Bethlehem Shipbuilding Corporation, Ltd.
- Founded: February 15, 1901
- Founder: Thomas A. Watson, et al.
- Defunct: June 1, 1986
- Fate: Closed in 1986
- Headquarters: Quincy, Massachusetts, United States
- Key people: Thomas A. Watson, Francis T. Bowles, Joseph P. Kennedy
- Products: Merchant vessels, warships
- Number of employees: Under 1,000
- Parent: General Dynamics Corporation

Fore River Shipyard was a shipyard on Weymouth Fore River in Braintree and Quincy, Massachusetts, that built hundreds of ships for military and civilian customers from 1883 to 1986.

The yard was founded in Braintree by Thomas A. Watson and Frank O. Wellington; it moved to Quincy Point in 1901. In 1913, it was purchased by Bethlehem Steel, and later transferred to Bethlehem Shipbuilding Corporation. It was sold to General Dynamics in 1963 and closed in 1986.

Most of the ships at the yard were built for the United States Navy. Its first government contract, for the destroyer USS Lawrence (DD-8), was followed by many others, including the battleship USS Massachusetts (BB-59), the cruisers USS Springfield (CL-66) and USS Salem (CA-139); and the aircraft carrier USS Lexington (CV-2) and its successor USS Lexington (CV-16). The yard built early submarines for Electric Boat, including USS Octopus (SS-9) and USS Sunfish (SSN-649). For foreign navies, Fore River produced five Type 1 submarines for the Imperial Japanese Navy, ten submarines for the Royal Navy, and the battleship ARA Rivadavia for the Argentine Navy.

The yard built several merchant marine ships, including Thomas W. Lawson, the largest pure sailing ship ever built, and SS Marine Dow-Chem, the first ship built to carry refrigerated chemicals. General Dynamics Quincy Shipbuilding Division, as it eventually came to be known, ended its career as a producer of LNG tankers and merchant marine ships.

The yard also built passenger liners, including Matson Line's SS Mariposa, SS Monterey, and SS Lurline and American Export Lines' SS Independence and SS Constitution.

It was home to the second-largest shipbuilding crane in the world. It had two sub-yards: the Victory Destroyer Plant in Quincy during World War I and the Bethlehem Hingham Shipyard in Hingham during World War II. The yard also owned Bethlehem Atlantic Works, a drydock in East Boston.

One theory holds that the yard was the origin of the "Kilroy was here" graffito.

== History ==
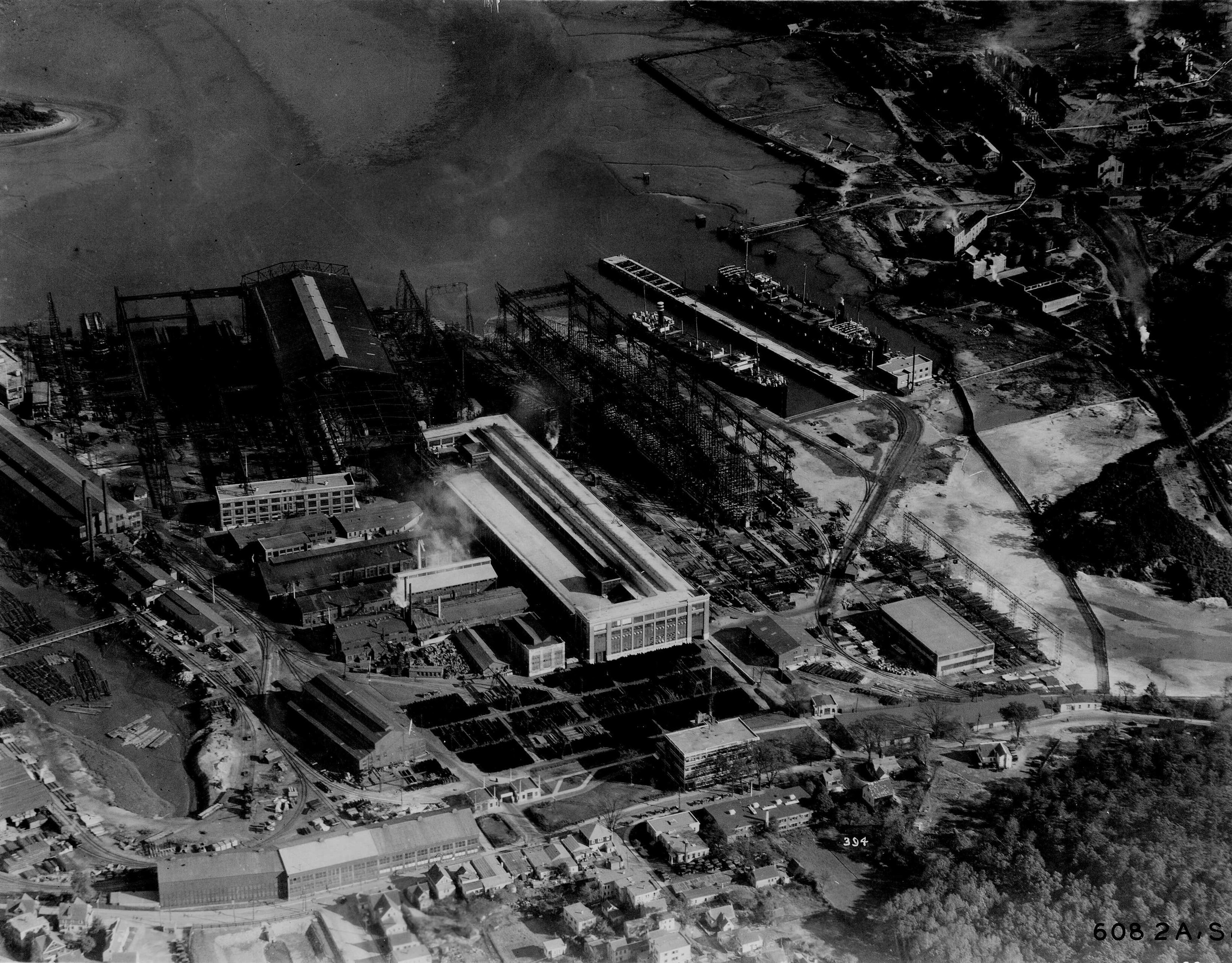
Shipyard in 1921

=== Origins ===
The shipyard traces its beginnings to 1882, when Thomas A. Watson purchased a farm alongside the Fore River in East Braintree, Massachusetts. In 1884, Watson unsuccessfully attempted to farm the land, but switched his focus to developing a steam engine after he was approached by a local businessman. He gave up that effort the following year, and decided to work with business partner Frank O. Wellington on shipbuilding.

=== Fore River Engine Company ===
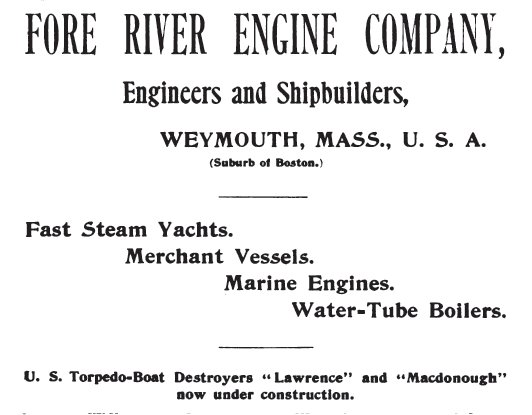
1899 advertisement for the Fore River Shipyard

The pair created the Fore River Engine Company after receiving an order from Maine for a 50-horsepower engine. Their first ship, the Barnacle, was fitted with local furnishings. Watson later said of this decision:

It was a momentous decision for from it came one of the largest shipbuilding establishments in the country, if not in the world, that made Massachusetts again a shipbuilding center and afterwards played an important part in the World War.

The shipyard's engines gained a reputation for quality along the eastern seaboard. Soon, a new engine-building facility was constructed, employing between twenty and thirty workers. Additionally, the Prouty Printing Press and Sims-Dudley dynamite gun, staple guns for shoes, and electric light accessories were produced by Fore River. Fore River made many products because Watson wanted to employ as many friends as possible.

The Panic of 1893 limited the yard's possibilities, but the United States Navy awarded a contract to them to construct USS Lawrence (DD-8) and USS Macdonough (DD-9). These two ships were the last to be constructed at the East Braintree location, as the yard moved down the river to a site on nearby Quincy Point in 1901. The construction of United States lightship LV-72 alongside the destroyers further strengthened the company financially.

The awarding of USS Des Moines (CL-17) was also beneficial for Fore River. Faced with the problem of not having a large enough area to build the cruiser, the contract was produced at the new Quincy yard. The Des Moines was launched in 1902 and commissioned in 1904, bringing with it some financial stability to the yard, as new revenues were quadruple those at the East Braintree location. During the construction of the new yard, old buildings were floated over to make up for the lack of buildings at the new location, and it was constructed with some of the largest shipbuilding equipment of the time.

=== Fore River Ship and Engine Company ===
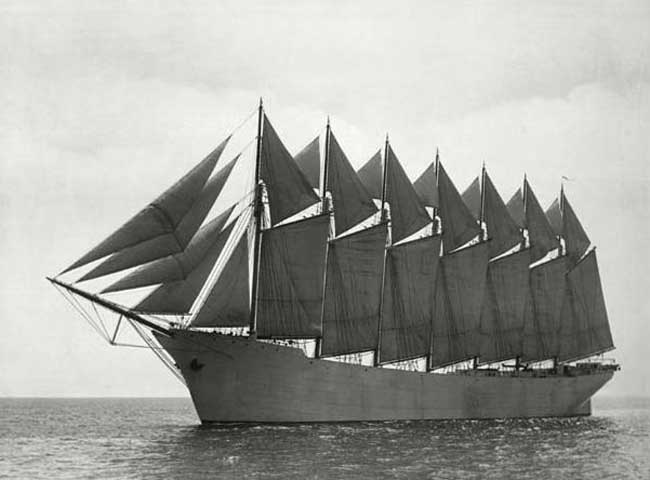
Thomas W. Lawson on her maiden voyage in 1902

The building of the new yard created ample space for building new ships, which allowed for the building of USS New Jersey (BB-16) and USS Rhode Island (BB-17). The Navy did mandate that before they could receive the bids, they would have to incorporate, so the company was incorporated in New Jersey, with a capital of $6.5 million (equivalent to $242 million in today's dollars). Immediately, Thomas A. Watson realized that the contract would be more costly than anticipated, but soon an order came in for the seven-masted Thomas W. Lawson. This was immediately followed by an order for the six-masted William L. Douglas, which was delivered in 1903.

In 1902, Watson decided to build the Fore River Railroad, a short-line railroad from East Braintree to the yard, 3 miles (4.8 km) away. This was done in order to save costs of having to remove supplies from the trains, transport it over land to Weymouth Fore River, and then float it over to the yard. Watson ended up buying a parcel of land after the owner refused to sell him 3 feet 0 inches (0.91 m) of land for the railroad.

During this time, the yard struggled financially, as expenses from suppliers exceeded reimbursement from the Navy. As a result, Watson decided to sell some of his telephone stock and secured a loan. At this time, the yard was awarded with a contract for USS Vermont (BB-20), although this did not solve the company's troubles. Following a failed attempt by Watson to seek reimbursement from the Navy, he eventually resigned and was replaced by former Admiral Francis T. Bowles, as he was pleased by how Bowles ran the yard.

In 1905, the yard got a contract to build the Brown-Curtis steam turbine engine, which was considered to be too fast to be economical at the day and age. That same year, the Navy awarded a contract to build the Chester-class cruisers at the yard, two of which were supposed to be equipped with the Brown-Curtis turbine, but which later received new turbines.

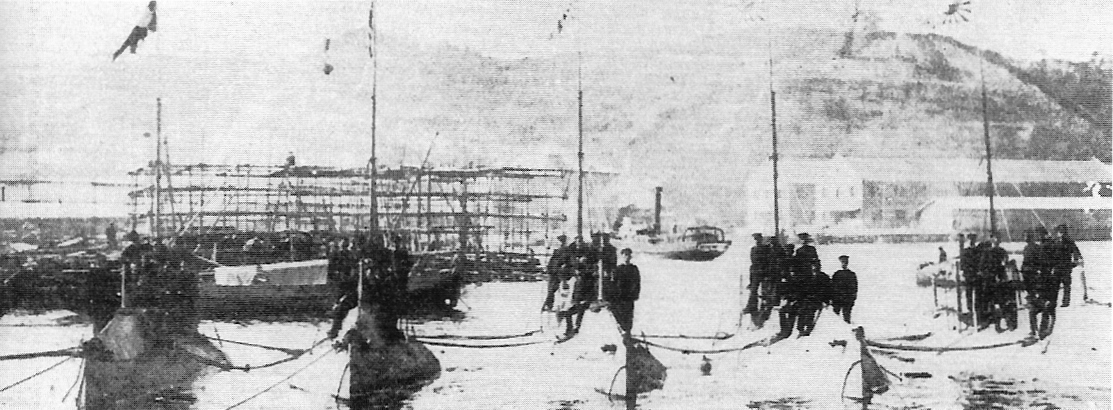
The first five submarines of the Imperial Japanese Navy in Japan

The Russo-Japanese War further benefited the yard, as the Imperial Japanese Navy contracted five Type 1 submarines at the yard. Little is known of the first submarines built at the yard, although they were promptly disassembled and shipped to the West Coast, from which they were shipped to Japan in 1904. The war brought expanded submarine development to the yard, as the Holland Torpedo Boat Company was purchased by the Electric Boat Company. Since Electric Boat had no yard of its own, it subcontracted to Fore River in order to complete orders. The first American submarine built at the yard was USS Octopus (SS-9), launched in 1906. This arrangement lasted for the next twenty years, until Electric Boat built its own yard in 1924. Fore River would remain the primary builder of Electric Boat-designed submarines through the S-class of 1922, completing a total of 69 submarines for the US Navy during this period.

During this time, the yard built civilian ships, including Sankaty, which was built for the New Bedford, Martha's Vineyard & Nantucket Steamboat Company. Furthermore, the company created the Fore River Apprentice School, in order to ensure that an adequately trained workforce would be able to work at the yard in the coming years. Over time, over 2,000 people were graduated from its program.

In 1906, USS New Jersey (BB-16) and USS Rhode Island (BB-17) were delivered by the shipyard, marking the yard's first battleships delivered. The completion of these two battleships and other ships at the yard coincided at a time when there were 2,500 people employed. In 1908, there were eighteen contracts employed at Fore River, which would not be met again until 1916. The yard also completed car floats for the New York, New Haven and Hartford Railroad during the time .

Of note, Fore River fielded a soccer team from at least 1907 to around 1920–1921. This team, which played in local leagues, was part of one of the early soccer leagues in the U.S..

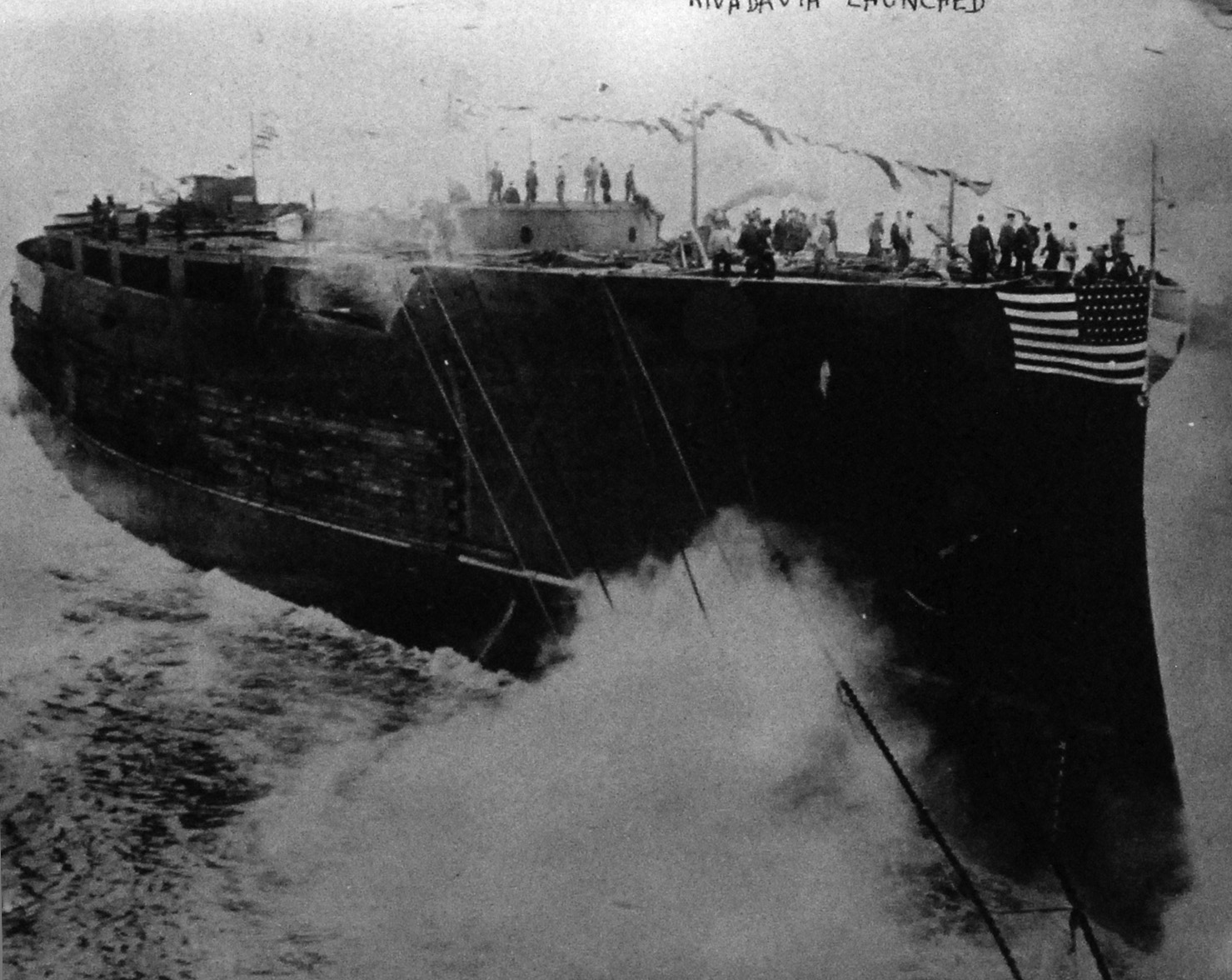
Launching of Rivadavia

Another big development in the history of the yard was the receiving of the contract to build the ARA Rivadavia for the Argentine Navy. The ship was one of two foreign battleships ever constructed in the United States, and occurred during the South American dreadnought race. After a long bidding process, the Argentine Naval Commission found that the Newport News Shipbuilding and Drydock Company bid was lowest on one battleship, and the Fore River Shipbuilding Company was lowest on the other. Despite some potential setbacks, the upcoming 1910 Pan-American Conference, and a guarantee of American participation in the Argentine centennial celebrations, Fore River secured the battleship contracts on 21 January 1910. (Note: There were five specific assurances (quoted from Livermore):) The maximum price Fore River tendered, $10.7 million, underbid the British by more than $973,000, but their ship's displacement was 2,000 long tons (2,032 t) smaller, the belt armor was 2 inches (51 mm) thinner, and the top speed was slightly slower.

Rivadavia was built by Fore River, but they were contractually obligated to subcontract the second ship to a different shipyard in the hope that both would be completed faster, so ARA Moreno was constructed by the New York Shipbuilding Corporation of Camden, New Jersey. The steel for the ships was largely supplied by the Bethlehem Steel Company of Pennsylvania, which, due to their ability to produce steel at a lower price than other nations, was an integral cost-saving measure.

The ship was laid down in 1910, but was finally delivered in 1914 after delays in construction due to a work backlog at the yard. It was because of this issue that Admiral Bowles suggested that the yard be sold to a larger corporation, as it would be able to better deal with the extra workload than the yard could on its own. The last ship laid down in the yard at the time was USS Nevada (BB-36), which happened in 1912.

In 1911, the yard was part of the case Fore River Shipbuilding Co. v. Hagg, in which a foreign citizen sued for the yard for reparation in the death of her husband, who was killed in the yard's forge shop. The case was later dismissed by the United States Supreme Court.

=== Bethlehem Shipbuilding Corporation, Ltd. ===
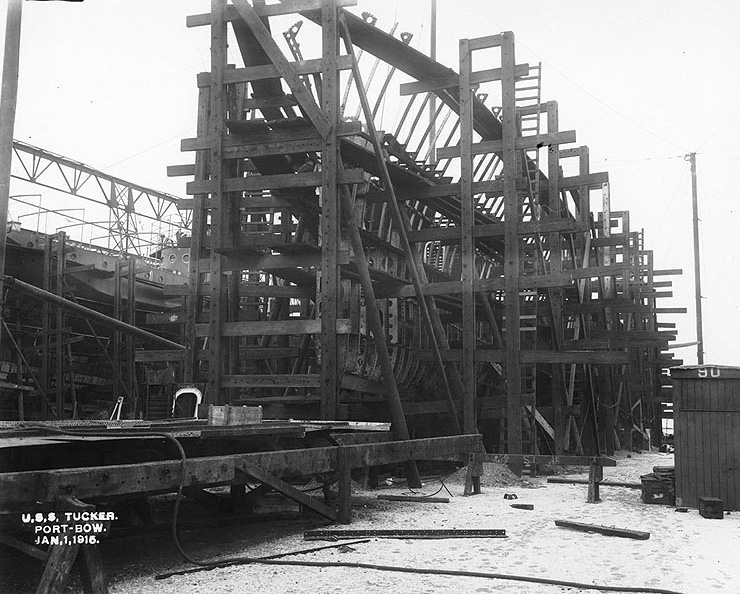
USS Tucker (DD-57) under construction in 1915, with USS Cushing (DD-55) visible in the background

In 1913, Bethlehem Steel Corporation bought the yard for $4.8 million (equivalent to $156 million in today's money), as Charles M. Schwab was looking to diversify the company. At the time, the yard was constructing 23 vessels and doing a business of $20 million (equivalent to $652 million in today's dollars) a year. The yard was 110 acres (45 ha; 0.17 sq mi) in size, and had a capacity for 60,000 short tons (54,000 t). At this time, Bethlehem decided to construct a drydock, although it would take into the 1920s to make this happen. Finally, immediate improvements were made to the yard to improve its financial well-being.

The first year of the company's ownership brought very little in terms of business. Two destroyers were ordered, three submarines were sublet in the yard, and no outside orders by private companies were received in this time. Furthermore, the Royal Navy placed an order during this time for ten submarines. Due to the fact that the United States was officially neutral during World War I, the yard prefabricated the submarines, and then shipped the parts to Canada for assembly. In 1915, the Spanish Navy contracted out the building of the submarine Isaac Peral (A-0) in the yard, while the United States Navy ordered USS T-1 (SS-52). Finally, the Texas Oil Company and the Edward F. Luckenbach Company ordered four tankers and freighters, respectively.

==== World War I ====
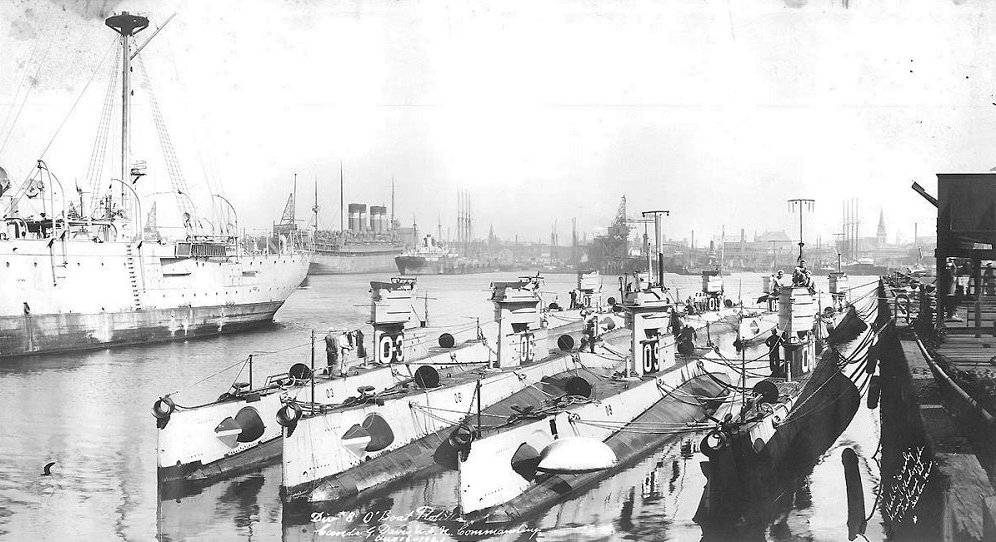
Nine O-class submarines from Submarine Division 8 at Boston Navy Yard, 1921, including many built at Fore River

War brought opportunities for expansion for the yard. This meant the building of a steel mill and a sheet metal shop that contained one of the best molds in the country. The steel mill was capable of prefabricating 250 short tons (230 t) of steel a day. A 1,000-foot (300 m) building slip was also constructed, costing $500,000 (equivalent to $18.6 million in today's dollars). The yard created a department that was dedicated to the welfare of its workers during this time, as well.

1916 brought nineteen contracts to the yard, eight of which were for the O-class submarine, and ten more submarines were laid down for the Royal Navy, with another ten being built in Montreal at the Canadian Vickers yard. The submarines, once built, were stored at the nearby Boston Navy Yard until the country entered the war. Over 15,000 persons were working at the yard at the time, including Joseph P. Kennedy.

Entry of the United States into the war brought twenty-eight destroyer orders to the yard. Due to this sudden increase in production, the yard needed to expand. Soon, a suitable location was found on nearby Squantum Point, and the Victory Destroyer Plant started construction in 1917. Located on 70 acres (28 ha; 0.11 sq mi) of land, the yard exclusively built destroyers, with USS Osborne (DD-295) being the last ship constructed at the plant. In 1920, the yard was turned over to the United States government and dismantled. This same year, Bethlehem Steel split off its shipbuilding division into the Bethlehem Shipbuilding Corporation, which was headquartered at the yard.

Combined with the Squantum yard, Fore River turned out 71 destroyers during the war, more than any other American yard. Besides the other Quincy yard, Bethlehem built the Fields Point Plant for boiler construction in nearby Providence, Rhode Island and the Black Rock Plant for turbines in Buffalo, New York. The yard constructed USS Mahan (DD-102) in 174 days. Not to be outdone, the Squantum yard built USS Reid (DD-292) in twenty-eight days, delivering it to the Navy seventeen days later. Such was the speed at which the yard produced ships that the Navy was forced to moor the ships at the Boston Navy Yard for lack of crews. The yard's speed allowed for the management to enter a bet with another Bethlehem plant, Union Iron Works, to see which plant would deliver more ships in a year. At the end of 1918, Fore River delivered eighteen ships to Union's six.

==== Interwar and Great Depression ====
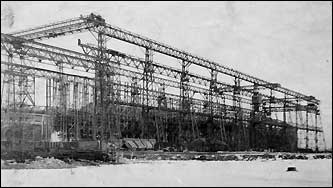
LEXINGTON on ways under gantry cranes at Fore River, c. 1922

The end of World War I did not immediately affect the yard, as it was still producing ships from wartime orders. The only cancellations that occurred in the yard after the war were the cancellation of the Lexington-class battlecruiser USS Lexington (CC-1). This was offset by the construction of two cruisers, which were delivered in due time. Additionally, the yard finished building the multiple orders that it received for the S-class submarine, as well as orders for two other submarines.

Between 1922 and 1925, the yard underwent a major expansion period, including the purchase of the Atlantic Works, which later became Bethlehem Atlantic Works. Bethlehem also purchased a floating drydock from Simpson’s Dry Dock Company, built a battleship slip, and constructed a new way for merchant ships. The terms of the Washington Naval Treaty in 1921 brought the conversion of the Lexington to an aircraft carrier (USS Lexington (CV-2)), which was launched in 1925 in front of a group of over 20,000 people. The treaty brought about the cancellation of USS Massachusetts (BB-54), part of the now-prohibited South Dakota-class battleship. The hull was eventually scrapped in 1923 with only 11% of the ship completed.

The post-war lull brought about new opportunities for the yard, as it converted or upgraded ships such as SS Minnekahda (1917), and overhauled locomotives for the New York, New Haven and Hartford Railroad. The yard produced brass fittings for banjo clocks, in an attempt by Charles Schwab to keep the talented workers employed. Eventually, this lull ended in 1925 with the order of a ferry for the City of Boston. Around this time, the yard received orders for USS Northampton (CA-26) and USS Portland (CA-33), both the lead ships of their respective classes. At the end of 1925, the yard had built 400 ships, 111 of which were military contracts, while the other 289 were for civilian organizations. Furthermore, the yard built the liners SS Monterey, SS Mariposa and SS Lurline for the Oceanic Steamship Company.

The Great Depression brought little work to the yard, with the exception of the completion of USS Quincy (CA-39) and USS Vincennes (CA-44). USS Wasp (CV-7) was built from 1936 to 1940, in addition to a handful of destroyers. Employment in the yard dropped drastically during this time, from 4,900 in 1931 to 812 two years later.

==== World War II ====
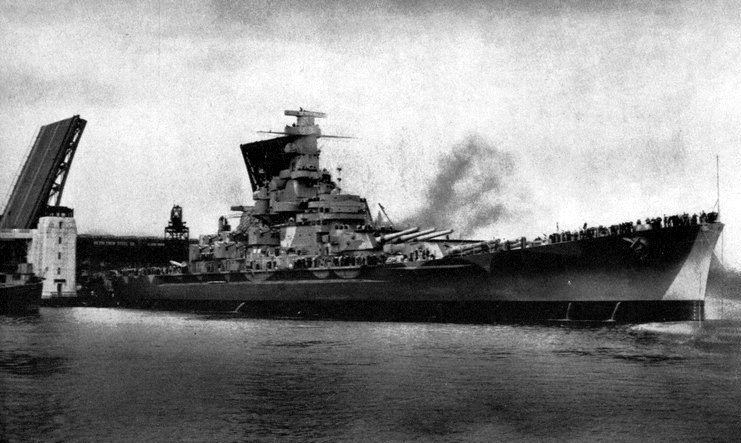
USS Massachusetts leaving the Weymouth Fore River, passing between the opened Fore River Bridge into Quincy Bay

The Naval Act of 1938 brought increased shipbuilding to the yard, as it mandated a 20% increase in the strength of the nation's Navy. This brought an expansion of business to the yard, with 17,000 employees working in December 1941 and 32,000 in 1943, including 1,200 women. Payroll reached $110 million (equivalent to $2.05 billion in today's dollars) around this time, and contracts amounted to around $700 million (equivalent to $13 billion in today's dollars).

The speed of construction at the yard increased, as the keel of USS Vincennes (CL-64) was laid immediately after USS Massachusetts (BB-59) was launched. The speed of the construction ran in line with the building of more ships. USS San Juan (CL-54) was cut up and relocated three times in order to accommodate the construction of other ships. Much like World War I, the yard expanded, and built the Bethlehem Hingham Shipyard in order to accommodate the increased construction demands. Sixteen ways were constructed on over 96 acres (39 ha; 0.150 sq mi), and 227 ships were produced with 23,500 workers.

The yard produced USS Hancock (CV-19) in fourteen and a half months, and USS Pasadena (CL-65) in a record of sixteen and a half months. The yard built ninety-two vessels of eleven classes during the war, and earned the Army-Navy "E" Award for excellence of construction of vessels, which was awarded on 15 May 1942, with four stars being added during the course of the war. Additionally, the yard produced USS Lexington (CV-16), which was renamed from USS Cabot after the sinking of USS Lexington (CV-2) when yard workers petitioned for a renaming of the ship.

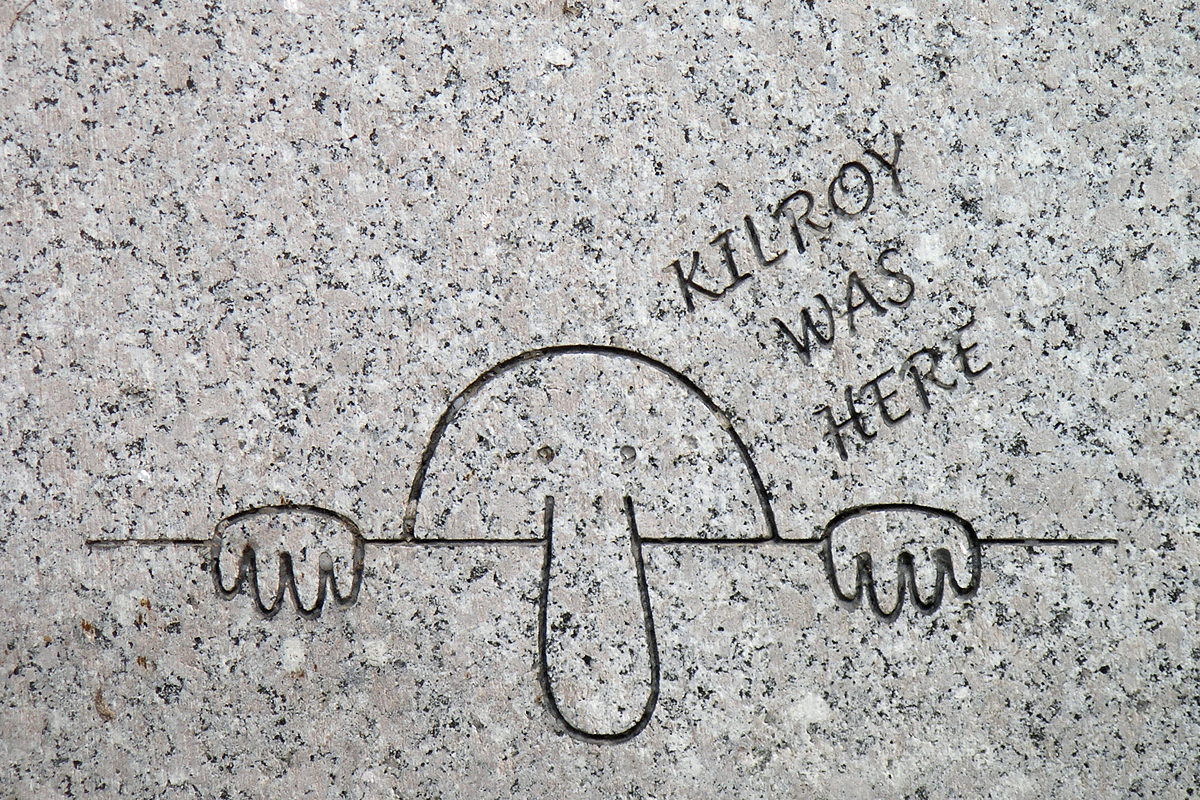
Engraving of Kilroy on the National World War II Memorial in Washington, D.C.

During the war, the yard was possibly the origin of the popular expression "Kilroy was here." Although it was not known originally where the phrase came from, the American Transit Association ran a contest trying to find the origin of the phrase in 1946. Welding inspector James J. Kilroy ended up sending his account in, and was deemed the winner. In an attempt to make sure that riveters would be prevented from defrauding the shipyard of their accurate workload, he scrawled the phrase in chalk on the ships that he was inspecting. Ships that the phrase was printed on included USS Massachusetts, USS Lexington, USS Baltimore (CA-68) and various troop carriers.

While the shipyard was at its peak of operations during the war, it was not uncommon for German U boats to stalk ships leaving the yard and engage them once offshore.

=== Post-war ===
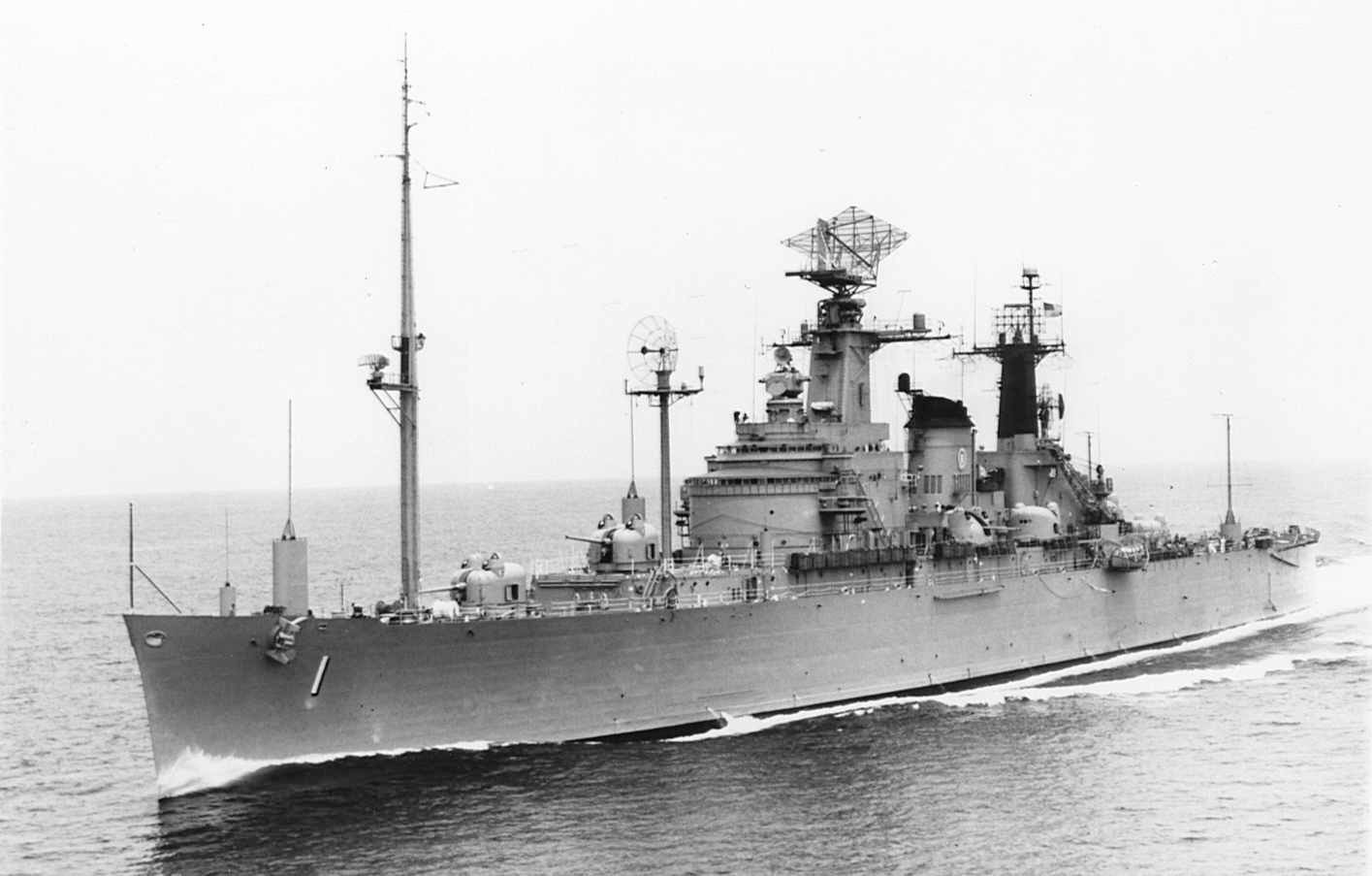
USS Northampton (CLC-1) in 1959

The end to wartime contracts left the shipyard with excess space, so it closed the Hingham yard and diversified its activities. The yard constructed a 28-foot (8.5 m) blast furnace, a wind tunnel, draglines, and steel for an aqueduct of the Boston's Metropolitan District Commission, a transformer for Boston Edison, among other things. The yard was faced with inflation, increasing material costs, and demands for higher wages.

The yard did continue to turn out war orders for the ships USS Des Moines (CA-134) and USS Salem (CA-139), the latter being the first ship in the Navy with air conditioning. The yard overhauled USS Ancon (AGC-4), SS Panama, and SS Cristobal of the Panama Railway Company. The yard ceased work until 1950 at the end of these conversions, with employment dipping to 3,800 employees. The line later took up building merchant ships for the American Export Lines, including the Type P3 ship ocean liners SS Independence and SS Constitution, with the most powerful turbines placed in a merchant ships at that time. The yard converted USS Northampton (CLC-1) and later USS Albany (CA-123) into guided-missile cruisers, and delivered them to the Navy in 1953 and 1958, respectively.

During this time, work continued to decline for the yard, although the yard found work in contracts from the United States Maritime Commission for three C4 tanker in 1951, and two more in 1952. Now, tankers became the yard's main work, with the Gulf Oil Corporation placing orders for two 28,000-short-ton (25,000 t) tankers, Socony ordering one 29,250-short-ton (26,540 t) tanker, and Orion contracting three more of the same tonnage. The Navy also ordered USS Neosho (AO-143), which weighed 13,300 short tons (12,100 t) and was an improvement over previous designs. Around this time, the yard began the construction of SS Marine Dow-Chem, the first ship which allowed for the shipment of chemicals over the ocean. Through refrigeration, this allowed for them to be transported safely and allowed for the carrying of eleven different chemicals at once. Furthermore, the yard built the C4-S-1 class freighter, a modification of the Type C4. Finally, the yard produced its largest destroyers yet, USS Willis A. Lee (DL-4) and USS Wilkinson (DL-5).

The yard's slow work after the war was a symptom of having a glut of extra ships that were available for the United States Merchant Marine. The passage of the Merchant Ship Sales Act of 1946 meant that ships could be sold for as little as $120.00 (equivalent to roughly $1,981 in today's dollars) per deadweight ton. The flip side of this glut of ships was that there was a prediction that in 1961, more ships would be need to be constructed. This was evidenced by the fact that in 1954, there were orders for five tankers, one fleet oiler, and five destroyers. The next year, the yard attempted to become part of the building of the Forrestal-class aircraft carriers when Bethlehem objected to the awarding of the contracts to the Newport News Shipbuilding and the New York Naval Yard. Although the company pointed out that it had produced many carriers during World War II, Newport News pointed out that the company never requested an improvement of its shipbuilding facilities by the government during the war, which hampered its future bidding of aircraft carrier construction. That it had not built a single carrier since the end of the war also hurt its chances. The yard was later rewarded four frigates to build instead.

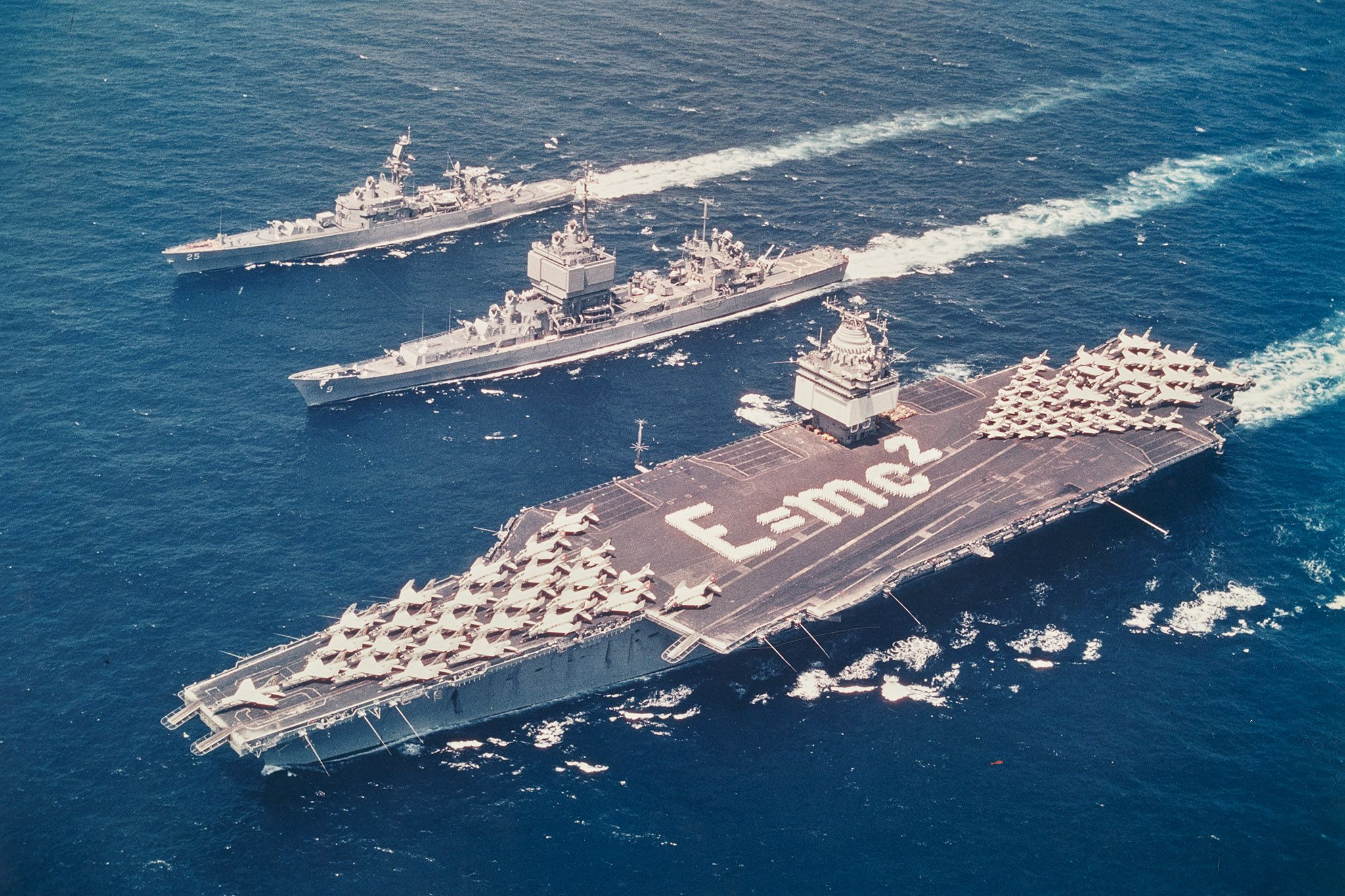
USS Bainbridge (top) and USS Long Beach, alongside USS Enterprise (CVAN-65) as part of Operation Sea Orbit

The yard began a new era when it was awarded construction of USS Long Beach (CGN-9), a nuclear guided-missile cruiser. Such was the amount of work involved in the building of the Long Beach that the yard had to decline building NS Savannah, the world's first nuclear-powered merchant ship. The yard entered into an expansion period during these years, replacing six pre-World War I sliding ways, which could now accommodate between three and six ships. Ships were built for the Greek shipping company Stavros Niarchos including a tanker with a capacity of 16.5 million US gallons (62 megalitres) of crude oil, named SS World Glory and SS World Beauty. The yard produced the nation's largest tanker, SS Princess Sophie, which was christened by Frederica of Hanover, Queen of Greece. Fore River also branched out into radar tower construction in this time, constructing Texas Tower 2 in 1955 and Texas Tower 3 in 1956.

The 1960s began with a five-month strike by workers over either wages and benefits (according to local newspapers), or unilateral work rules (according to the Industrial Union of Marine and Ship-building Workers). In the midst of the strike, the Navy towed USS Springfield (CL-66), which was under conversion at the time, to the nearby Boston Navy Yard for completion, an action which prompted both laborers and management to negotiate a three-year contract and helped to nullify unpopular work rules. Later that year, the Long Beach was launched, which was a major achievement for the yard.

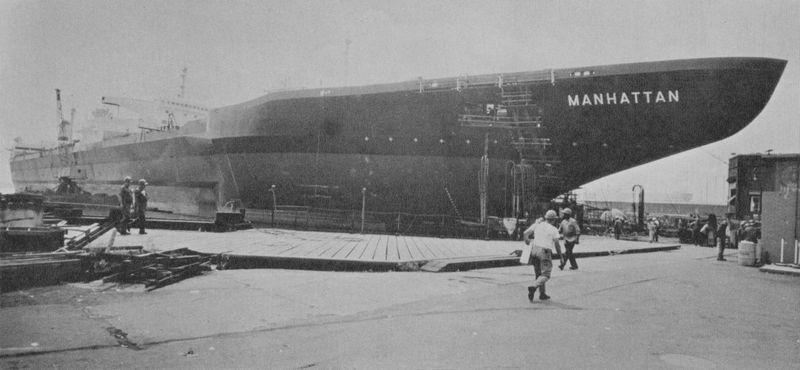
SS Manhattan in 1969

1962 brought about the construction of SS Manhattan, which was the largest commercial vessel built in the United States at the time, and became the first ship to transit the Northwest Passage to the Alaska North Slope oil fields. The Bainbridge was launched in that year, but not without accusations from the government that Bethlehem overcharged the Navy, as the costs increased from almost $70.1 million (equivalent to $774 million in today's dollars) in 1959 to a negotiated $87 million (equivalent to $926 million in today's dollars) three years later, down from an estimate of $90 million (equivalent to $958 million in today's dollars) before then, although there was a $5 million (equivalent to $53.2 million in today's dollars) discrepancy in the yard. After the end of the strike mentioned above, the yard was accused by the government of overcharging for the first nuclear frigate, USS Bainbridge (CGN-25) and the Long Beach. The shipyard later made up for the losses of $139,000 (equivalent to $1.5 million in today's dollars) by crediting on other contracts that were being offered.

1963 brought an end of an era to the yard, as Bethlehem put the yard up for sale. Fifty years of Bethlehem ownership, which began when the yard was near financial ruin, came to an end as the yard was one of the most established yards in the world.

=== General Dynamics Quincy Shipbuilding Division ===
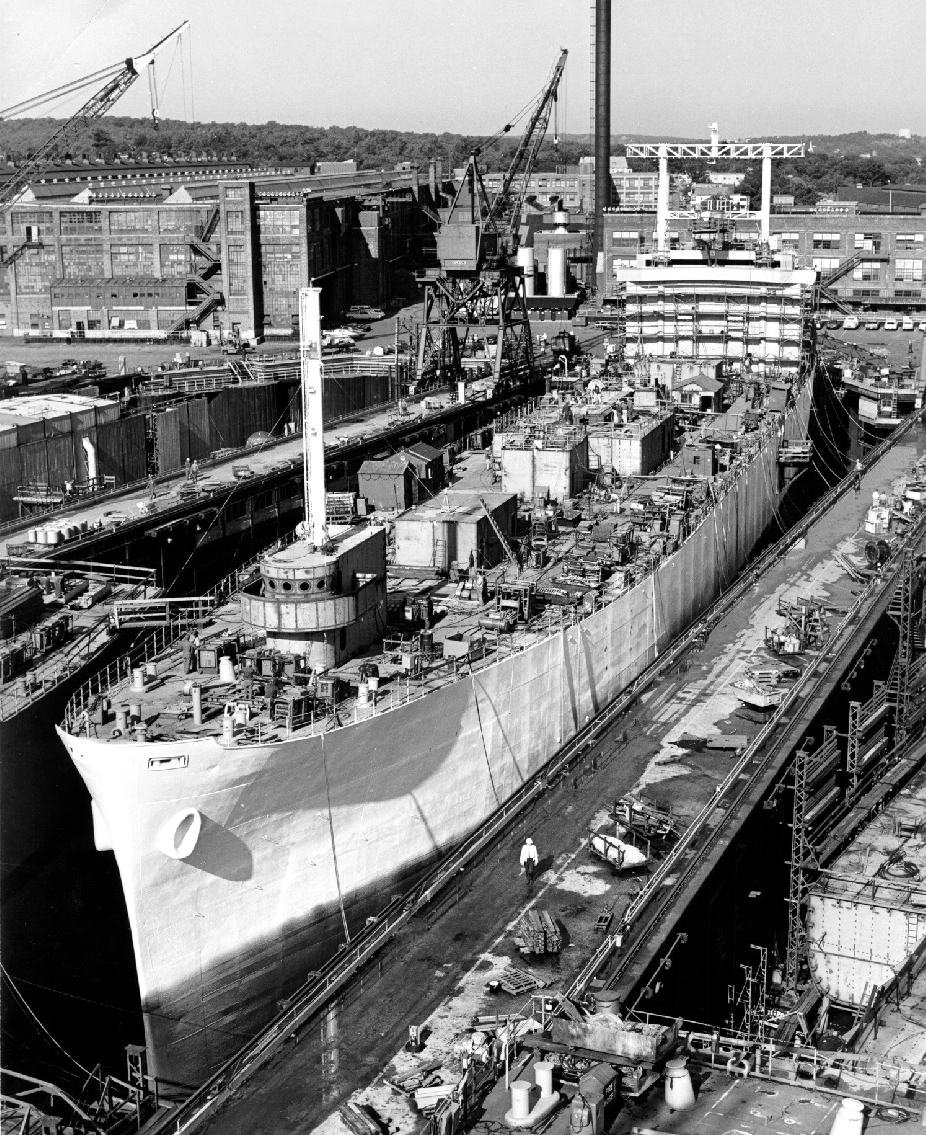
Conversion of USS Muscle Shoals (formerly USNS Mission San Fernando) into USNS Vanguard

In 1964, the yard was purchased by General Dynamics Corporation. J. William Jones, President of the company, stated that the yard was purchased in order to provide its Electric Boat division with increased flexibility. The yard was purchased for $5 million (equivalent to $51.9 million in today's dollars), and Electric Boat managed the yard until its reorganization. Immediately, the yard was closed by Bethlehem Steel on 1 January 1964, and it was announced that thirteen hundred of the yard's employees would be retired or pensioned off immediately or within the next two years, leaving five hundred workers left. General Dynamics immediately invested $23 million (equivalent to $239 million in today's dollars) into various facilities in the yard, improving it in many ways.

The yard was soon awarded the contract for the reconfiguration of the Apollo Instrumentation Ships from oilers. USNS Mission San Fernando (T-AO-122) was converted into USNS Vanguard (T-AG-194), USNS Mission De Pala (T-AO-114) was converted to USNS Redstone (T-AGM-20), and USNS Mission San Juan (T-AO-126) was renamed USNS Mercury (T-AGM-21). Also in the 1960s, the yard modified USS Greenling (SSN-614) and USS Gato (SSN-615), and built USS Whale (SSN-638) and USS Sunfish (SSN-649). Work began on USNS Kilauea (T-AE-26) and USS Butte (AE-27), both of which were ammunition ships, while construction began on the submarine tenders USS L. Y. Spear (AS-36) and USS Dixon (AS-37). Around this time, the yard began construction of the Seabee barges, for the Lykes Brothers Steamship Company, which were the first modular construction ships built by General Dynamics at the yard, although they were sued by Lykes for late delivery off the ships.

The addition of the Liquified natural gas tanker contracts in the early 1970s meant that the yard was due for another conversion. General Dynamics then invested $40 million (equivalent to $332 million in today's dollars) into more ways and wet basins in the yard, in order to be more competitive. The yard began construction of all of the Wichita-class replenishment oilers, with the exception of USS Roanoke (AOR-7). Cost overruns were an issue with these ships, although eventually the costs were negotiated. Furthermore, the yard built four of the Anchorage-class dock landing ships, which were delivered between 1970 and 1972. These ships were involved in cost overruns as well, and in 1975 the Naval Sea Systems Command awarded the yard $21 million (equivalent to $126 million in today's dollars) for these overruns.

The addition of modular construction to the yard meant that it could build ships by assembling pre-fabricated units, a technique that was used at the Victory Destroyer Plant during World War I. During the end of 1971, the yard was faced with declining contracts, which created rumors that the yard was close to closing. The yard was in discussion to gain a $350 million (equivalent to $2.78 billion in today's dollars) contract for six supertankers, which would carry 65 million US gallons (250 megalitres) of crude oil each. These tankers were supposed to be constructed with a forty-three percent subsidy from the federal government, which was granted. Eventually though, funding fell through, and construction did not proceed on the ships. Despite this, the yard modified USNS Hayes (T-AGOR-16), which was a $1.79 million (equivalent to $13 million in today's dollars) contract, where the ship received new equipment. This contract provided one hundred jobs for the yard.

The first attempt at government intervention for the yard came with Congressman James A. Burke aiming to stave off the imminent layoffs of two thousand workers. He attempted to get the yard awarded the contract for repairs to USS Puget Sound (AD-38). In a telegram to then-Secretary of Defense Elliot Richardson, he said that the closure of the Boston Navy Yard created a labor surplus. Unfortunately for the yard, the contract never panned out.

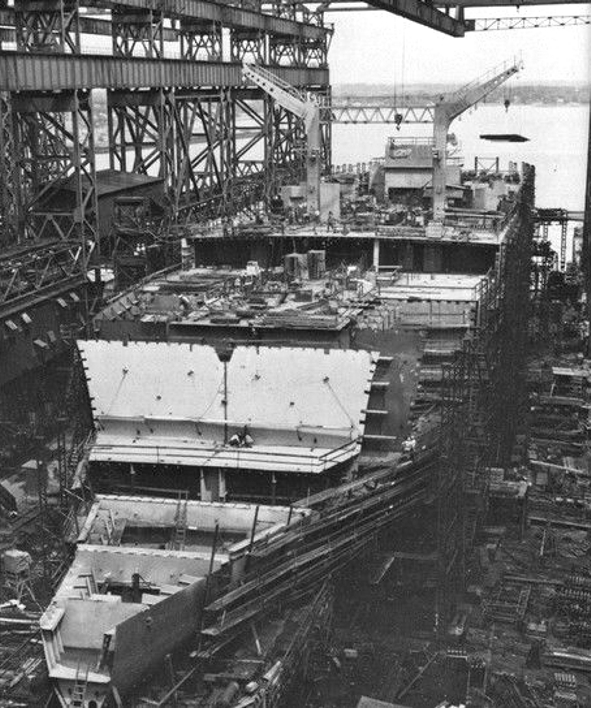
USS Kalamazoo under construction, in 1971

Delivery of USS Kalamazoo (AOR-6) in 1973 meant that the only work at the yard consisted of the modification of the Hayes and construction of cylinders for submarines at Newport News Shipbuilding and Electric Boat, which helped to maintain work for about two hundred and eighty machine shop workers. Economic salvation came to the yard during the construction of LNG-41, which was calculated to bring 5,500 to 6,000 workers employment. Projected to begin in July 1973, the work was delayed until December due to delays in yard improvements. In the meantime, the Irving Sealion was repaired at the yard. The Esso Halifax, which struck an iceberg on the way to Resolute Bay in Nova Scotia was repaired in the yard during this time.

The laying down of the LNG-41 occurred during the repair of USS West Milton (ARD-7), which was used to repair submarines at Naval Submarine Base New London. Congressman Burke was instrumental in securing this work, which kept the yard busy in 1974. That same year, a seventeen-week strike broke out, which created a situation where all work stopped and tanker work came to a halt. Eventually, the strike was resolved, but not before jeopardizing the future of the yard. After the settlement of the strike, USS Raleigh (LPD-1) was repaired at the yard in 1975, as General Dynamics had the lowest bid. In 1975, the yard had eight LNG contracts, which totaled $650 million (equivalent to $3.89 billion in today's dollars). It was around this time that the Goliath crane was constructed, which was a 1,200 short tons (1,100 t) crane built for the construction of tankers. Until it was removed in 2008, it was the largest gantry crane in North America.

The final construction project for the yard came in the form of construction of five 2nd Lieutenant John P. Bobo Class of Maritime Prepositioning ships. These ships could house equipment and supplies to house 4,000 Marines for thirty days, as well as everything they would need for combat. The ships were also designed to not need port facilities, as everything could be offloaded offshore. The ships were built by General Dynamics and initially were operated by General Dynamics' American Overseas Marine under a 25-year charter. The end of the construction of these ships in May 1986 meant that there was no longer any need for the yard, as attempts to secure container ships for United States Lines and survey ships for the Navy fell through. In 1986, the yard closed, with remaining employees either retiring or being laid off. In 1987, General Dynamics Quincy Shipbuilding Division ceased operation. The closure of the yard came after an unsuccessful attempt by employees to purchase the yard. On 1 June 1986, Fore River Shipyard closed for good.

=== Redevelopment ===
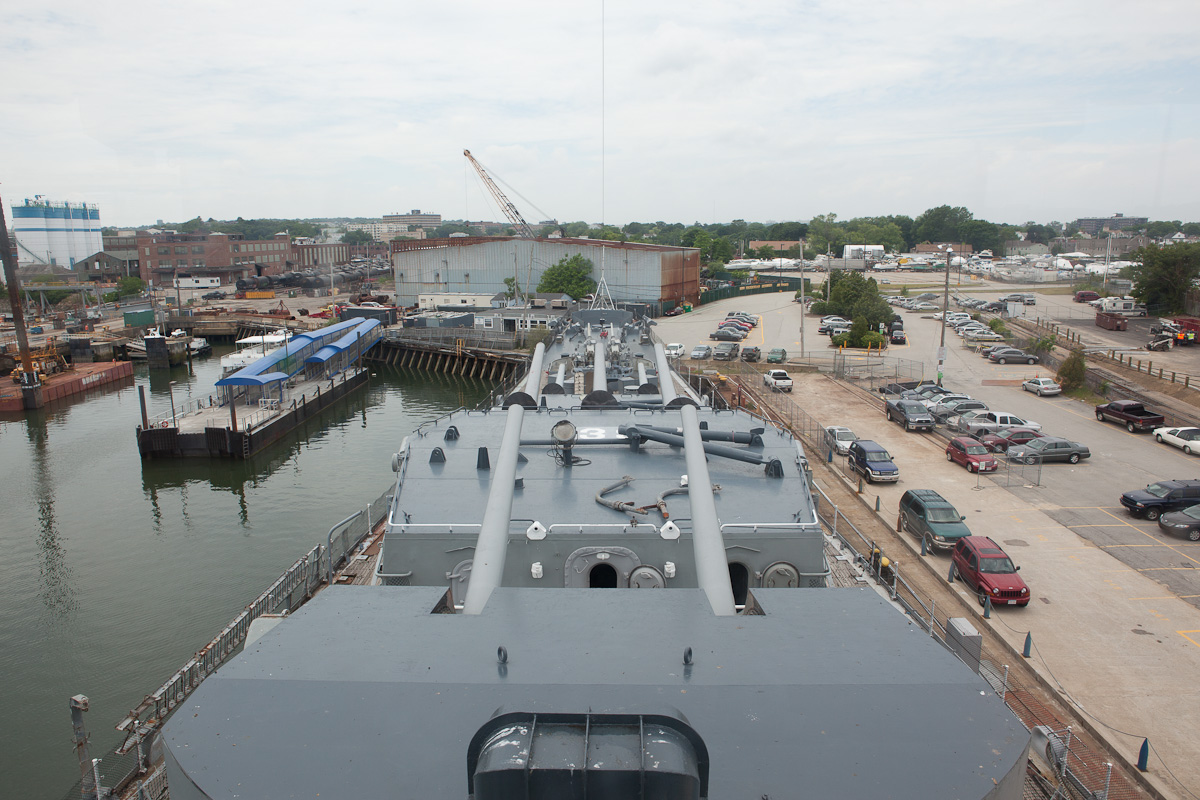
On the bridge of USS Salem, looking over the former yard in 2010

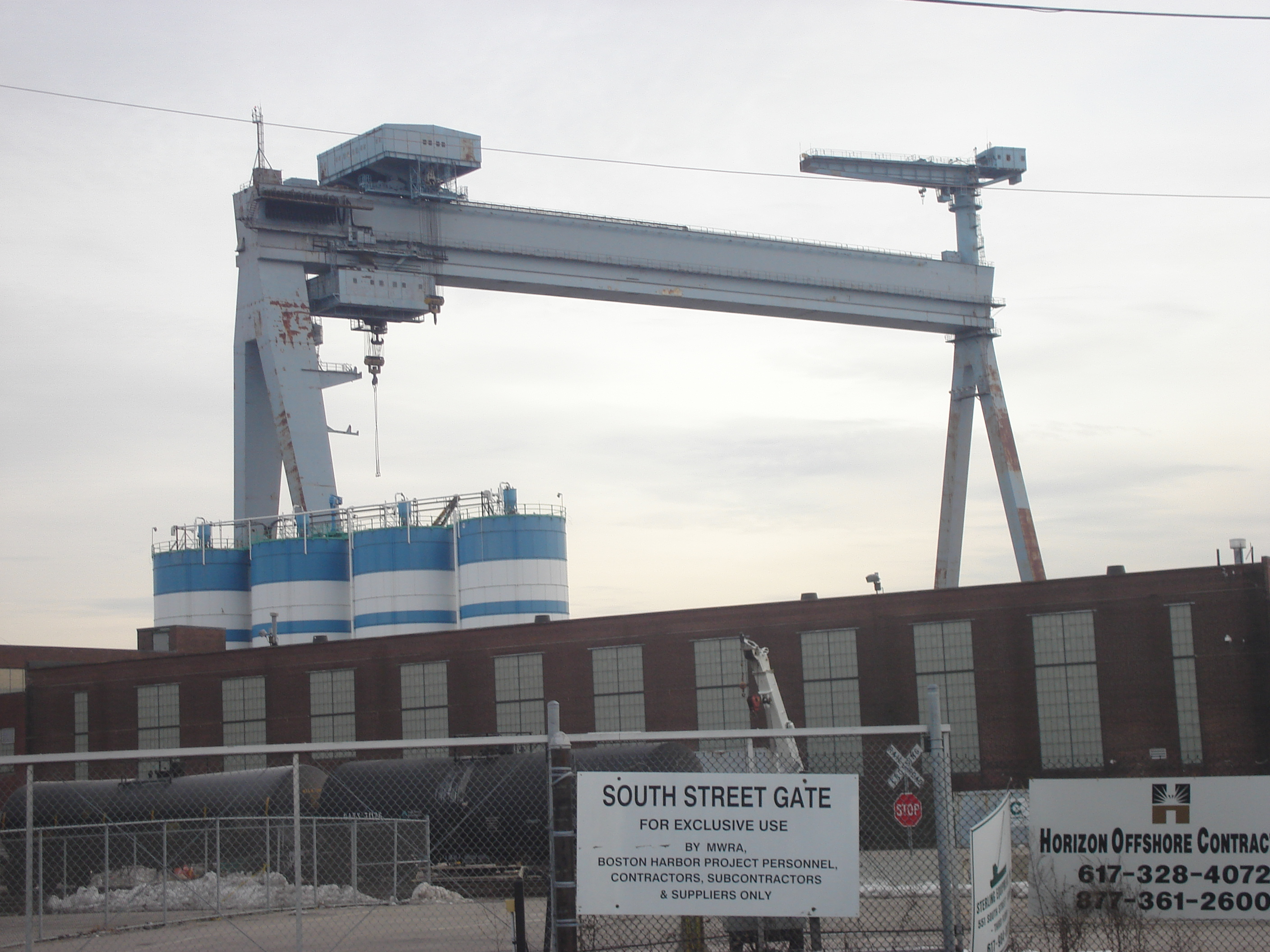
Goliath crane, January 2008

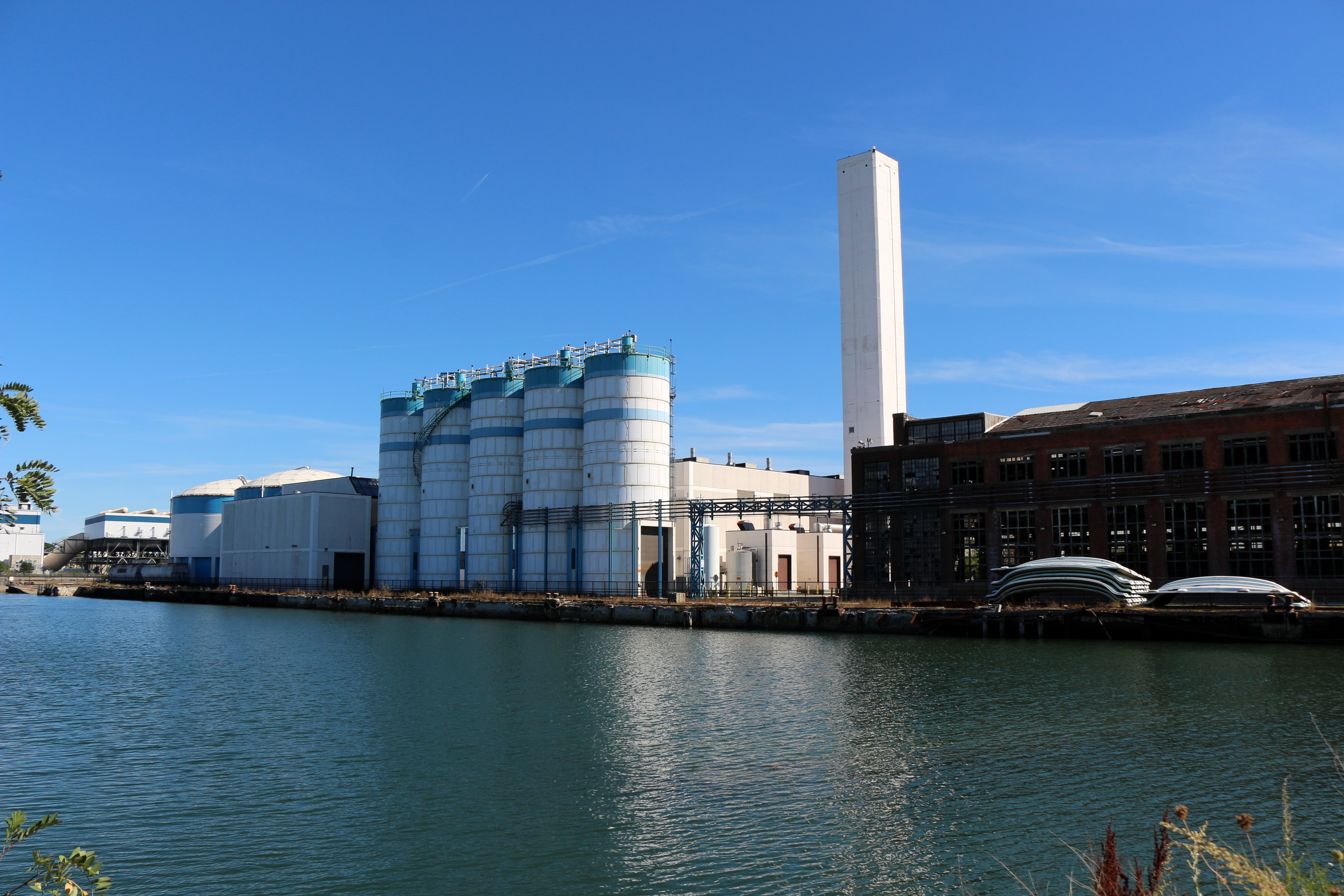
The Massachusetts Water Resources Authority pelletizing plant

Closure of the division initially led to dormancy at the yard. Some equipment was sold off while other parts of the yard were used for staging areas of the Boston Harbor cleanup project. Various plans were then offered at the time for use of the shipyard.

During this period, a ship scrapping operation, operating under the name Fore River Shipyard and Iron Works existed at one end of the yard. An initial purchase of five former Forrest Sherman-class destroyers was made, which included the USS Forrest Sherman (DD-931), USS Davis (DD-937), USS Manley (DD-940), USS Du Pont (DD-941), USS Bigelow (DD-942) and USS Blandy (DD-943). Of these, Du Pont was the only one that was successfully scrapped, as the company concluded that the costs of scrapping the other ships would exceed their scrap value. The company later sought bankruptcy protection in 1994, and the remaining ships were sold to other scrap dealers by the Massachusetts Bankruptcy Court.

In 1992, a group of volunteers came up with the idea of purchasing a ship built at the shipyard and relocating it to a new museum that would celebrate the history of the yard. In 1993, the United States Naval Shipbuilding Museum was established by the Massachusetts General Court with the aim to, "acquire, refurbish and maintain United States naval ships and the adjacent physical complex in order that it will [serve] as a major attraction for local citizens and tourists." Initially, plans called for the purchase of USS Lexington (CV-16), but the museum ended up getting USS Salem (CA-139), the last all-gun heavy cruiser ever built, returned to the Quincy yard after negotiations with the Naval Sea Systems Command. On 30 October 1994 Salem returned to Quincy to be permanently docked where she was built nearly five decades before. In May 2014, however, it was announced that the Salem would be moved to East Boston after the pier the ship was berthed and closed the previous September due to safety reasons. The move never took place, and the ship remains open as a museum at Fore River.

In 1995, Sotirious Emmanouil purchased the former yard and promised to restore shipbuilding to the yard, through his company Massachusetts Heavy Industries. The company cleaned up much of the yard and built a handful of buildings after securing a $55 million (equivalent to $116 million in today's dollars) loan, but was unable to secure any contracts and became mired in disputes. The company eventually defaulted on its loans and the property was seized by the United States Maritime Administration in 2000, with its assets being auctioned off a few years later.

Daniel J Quirk, a local auto dealer, bought the property in 2004 for use as a motor vehicle storage and distribution facility. Before the Great Recession hit, he publicized plans to redevelop the yard into condominiums and a living history exhibit, and cited Marina Bay, which is located at the old Victory Destroyer Plant and the Charlestown Navy Yard as examples of what he wanted to turn the yard into. In 2006, as he was trying to sell the Goliath crane, he acknowledged that if he was unable to sell it, he would probably have it scrapped due to it becoming dangerous due to ongoing deterioration of the structure.

On 14 August 2008, ironworker Robert Harvey was killed when a portion of the Goliath crane collapsed during dismantlement. Work on the crane's removal was halted for two months while local and federal officials investigated the accident, but the work later resumed and was completed in early 2009. As a result of their investigation, on 13 January 2009 the U.S. Occupational Safety and Health Administration imposed fines totalling $68,000 (equivalent to $101,685 in today's dollars). A barge carrying the crane was christened USS Harvey in honor of the fallen worker and left the shipyard on 7 March 2009 en route to Romania.

The August 2008 fatal incident was preceded by two other deaths involving demolition of the main gantry crane at the shipyard on 26 January 2005. The earlier incident resulted in an OSHA ruling against Testa Corporation of Lynnfield, Massachusetts, including a proposed $60,400 (equivalent to $99,569 in today's dollars) fine. Following the 2005 collapse, violations involving improper cleanup and removal of asbestos found in debris left by the accident resulted in a $75,000 (equivalent to $119,780 in today's dollars) penalty imposed against Testa by the Massachusetts Department of Environmental Protection.

The former shipyard served as a port for commuter boats to Boston run by Harbor Express for the Massachusetts Bay Transportation Authority (MBTA). This service was discontinued in 2013 when a dock in Quincy was severely damaged. Currently, there are no plans to revive this service. The yard is also used by Jay Cashman, Inc., for heavy construction and marine equipment services, by the Massachusetts Water Resources Authority as a sewage sludge heat-drying and pelletizing facility, and by Fore River Transportation Corporation for short line freight rail service to CSXT South Braintree. The yard was also used as the main construction area for the new Fore River Bridge, which is located adjacent to the property.

Although shipbuilding operations ceased in 1986, the name of the yard continues to be used, and the location is still referred to as Fore River Shipyard.

==== Appearances in film ====
Several movies have used the Fore River Shipyard as a filming location. The climactic shootout from the 2006 film The Departed was shot there, as were scenes from 2010's The Company Men. For the 2015 film The Finest Hours, sets and a giant water tank were constructed at the yard. The film also used the former USS Salem (CA-139).

=== Shipways ===
Shipway	Width	Length	Date	Source
1	28 feet (8.5 m)	130 feet (40 m)	1941	
1	28 feet (8.5 m)	130 feet (40 m)	1941	
2	40 feet (12 m)	375 feet (114 m)	1941	
3	40 feet (12 m)	375 feet (114 m)	1941	
4	95 feet (29 m)	550 feet (170 m)	1920	
5	90 feet (27 m)	700 feet (210 m)	1915-30	
6	76 feet (23 m)	675 feet (206 m)	1915-31	
7	84 feet (26 m)	675 feet (206 m)	1902-42	
8	84 feet (26 m)	675 feet (206 m)	1901-42	
9	82 feet (25 m)	650 feet (200 m)	1916-30	
10	110 feet (34 m)	875 feet (267 m)	1917-30	
11	150 feet (46 m)	1,000 feet (300 m)	1941	
12	150 feet (46 m)	1,000 feet (300 m)	1941	

== Ships constructed ==
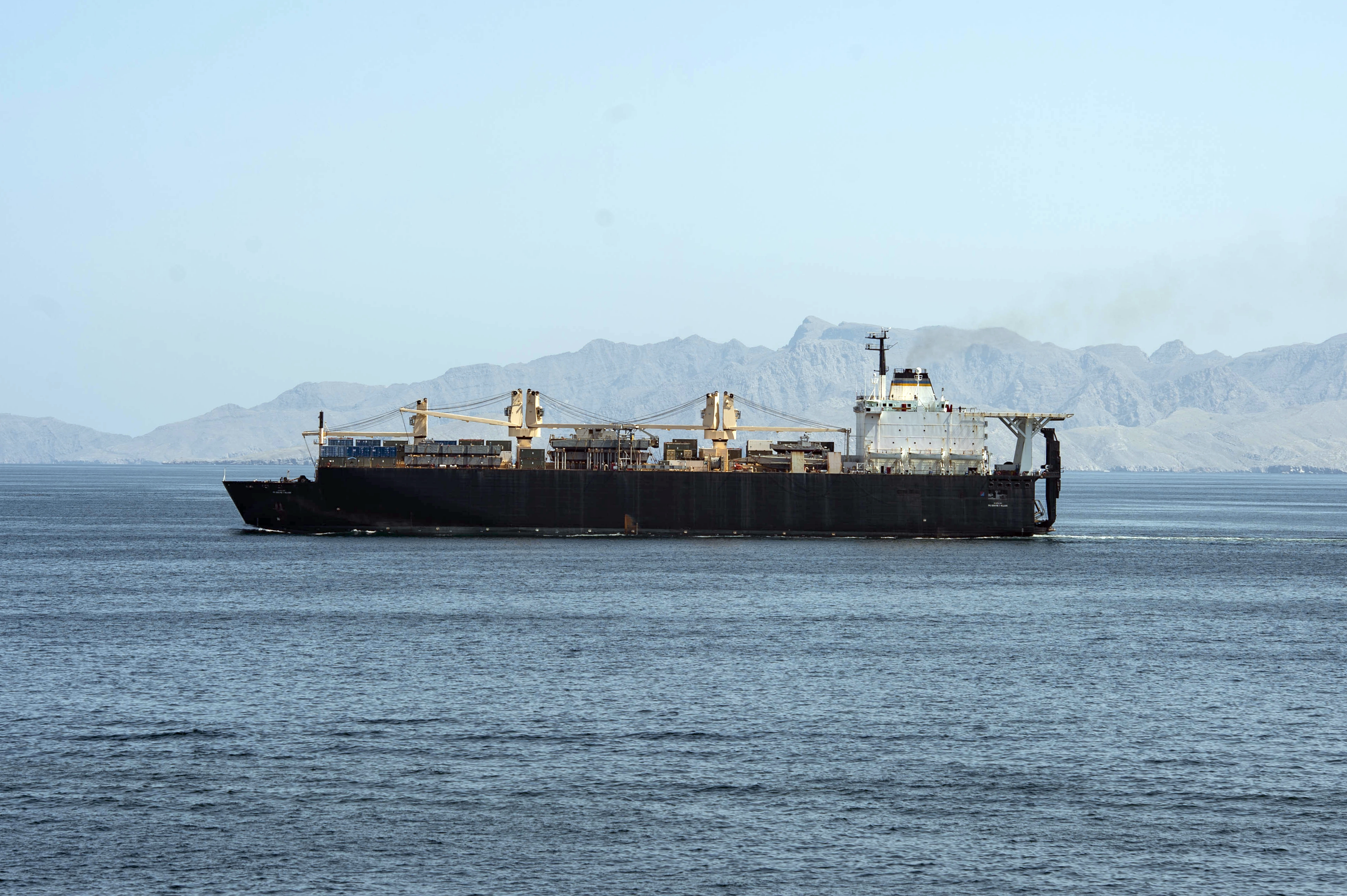
USNS PFC Dewayne T. Williams (T-AK-3009), in April 2020

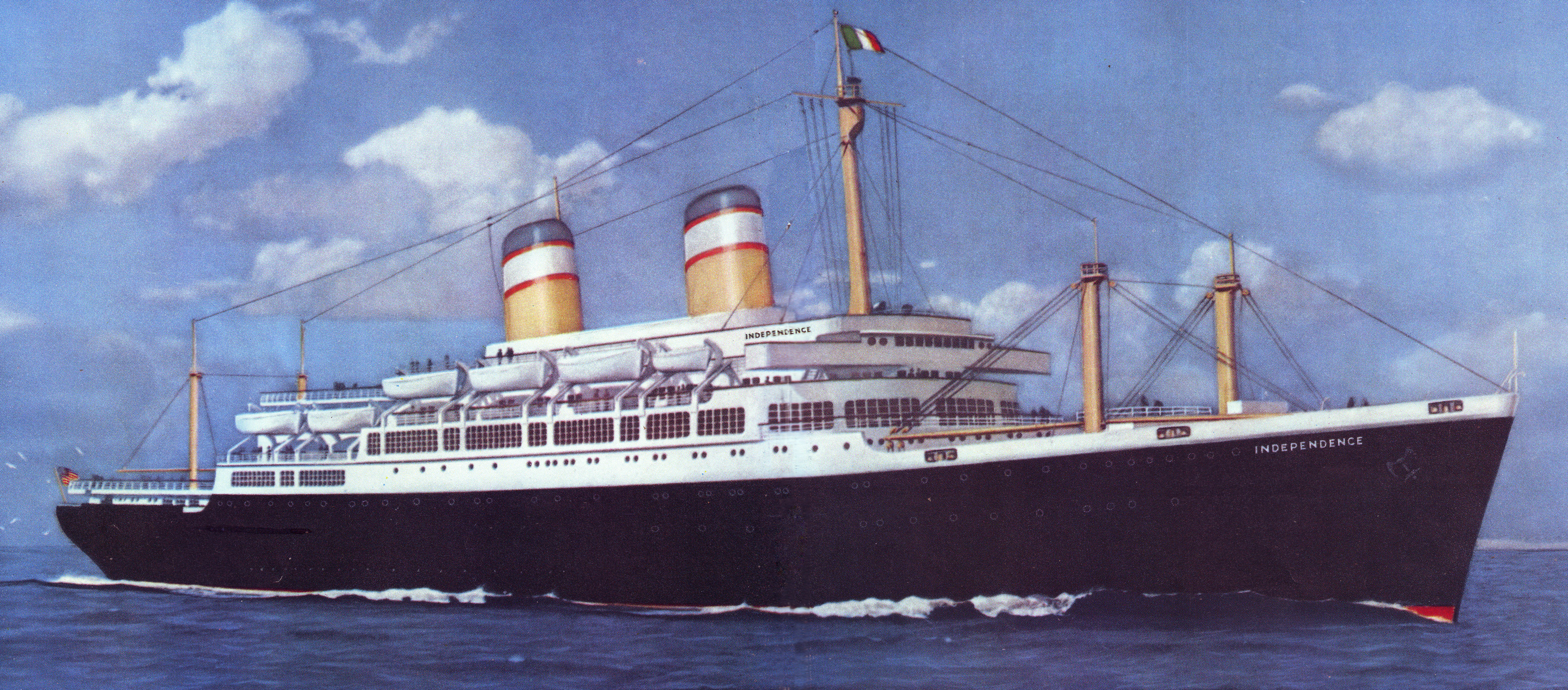
SS Independence

During the almost one hundred years that the yard was operational, it produced hundreds of ships, submarines, and personal sailing vessels. Among these orders were the civilian ships the Barnacle and the multiple-masted schooners the Thomas W. Lawson and William L. Douglas. The yard produced military contracts, including USS Lawrence (DD-8) and USS Macdonough (DD-9). Submarines were constructed, including USS Octopus (SS-9) for the United States Navy, and others for both the Imperial Japanese Navy and the Royal Navy.

As the yard was expanded over the years, it built battleships such as USS New Jersey (BB-16), USS Nevada (BB-36), and the preserved USS Massachusetts (BB-59), itself moored in Battleship Cove. Other naval ships include the preserved heavy cruiser USS Salem (CA-139) (as part of the United States Naval Shipbuilding Museum adjacent to the shipyard), USS Northampton (CLC-1), and USS Long Beach (CGN-9). The yard constructed multiple aircraft carriers, including the conversion of the battlecruiser USS Lexington CC-1''s hull into USS Lexington (CV-2), USS Lexington (CV-16), USS Bunker Hill (CV-17), and USS Philippine Sea (CV-47).

After the war, the yard found itself faced with changing realities, and increasingly relied on merchant marine ships, including SS Marine Dow-Chem, the first chemical transport ship in the United States and SS Manhattan. The yard built passenger vessels, including SS Lurline, SS Independence, SS Constitution. The last ships built at the yard were the 2nd Lieutenant John P. Bobo Class of Maritime Prepositioning ships. With the building of USNS Sgt. William R. Button (T-AK 3012), the yard closed for good.
