= Quincy Point =

Neighborhood of Quincy, Massachusetts

Coordinates: 42.245961°N 70.988503°W

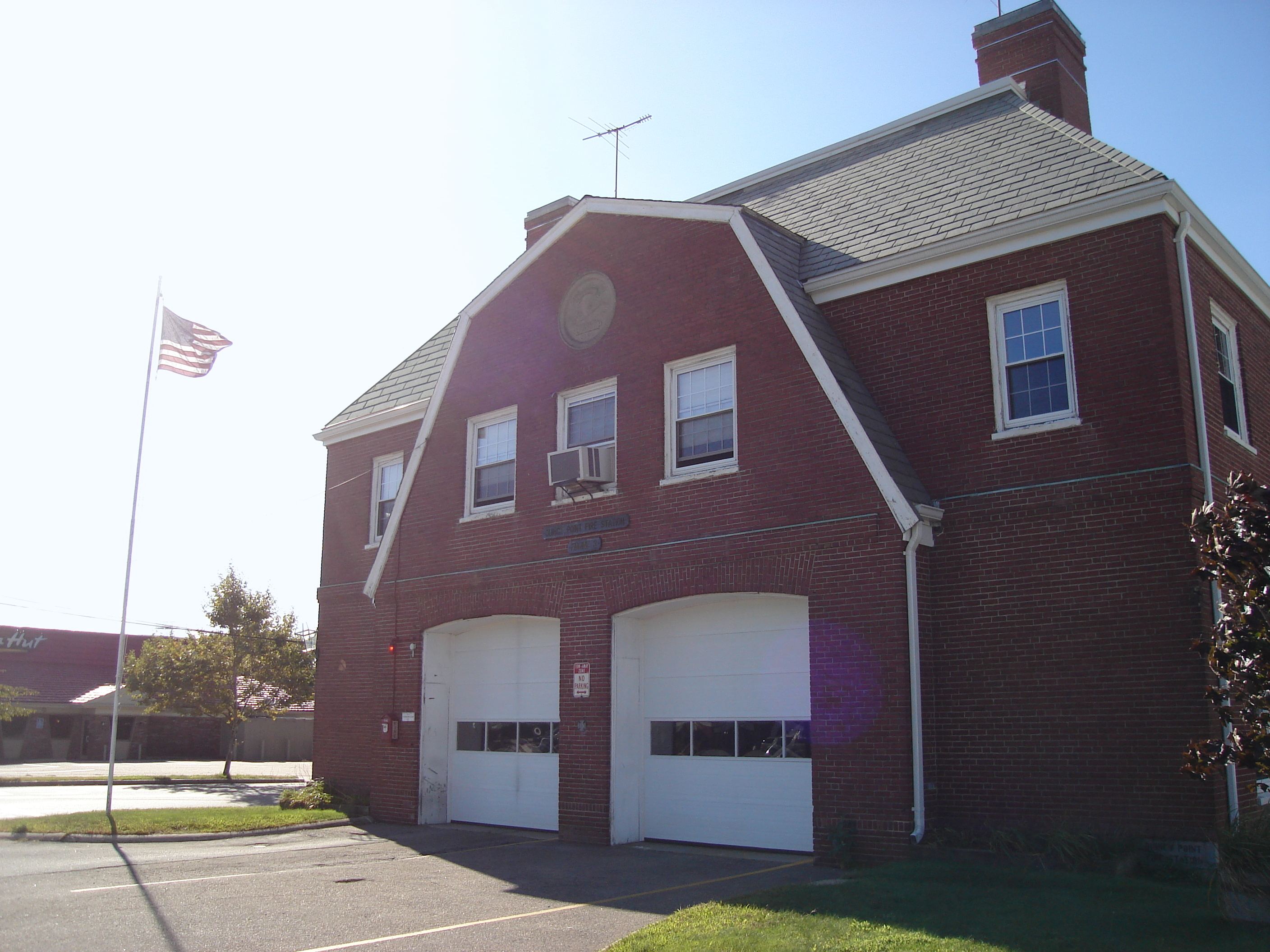
Quincy Point Fire Station, entered into the National Register of Historic Places in 1994.

Quincy Point is a neighborhood of Quincy, Massachusetts. "The Point" is generally defined as the land east of Quincy Center, the downtown district. Quincy Point is bordered on the west by Elm Street, on the east by Weymouth Fore River and the Braintree city line, on the north by Town River and on the south by Quincy Avenue. The area altitude averages about 30 feet (9.1 m) above sea level. The population of this neighborhood in 2000 was 11,414.

== History ==
Early in its history, Quincy Point was known as the "Great Fenced Fields". This area included the part of old Braintree prior to the 1792 formation of Quincy that was south of Town River and west of Weymouth Fore River where it makes its turn north toward Hingham Bay.

Quincy Point is the site of the former Fore River Shipyard, located in the neighborhood since 1901. The shipyard is famous for launching ships commissioned by the United States Navy, including the World War II battleship USS Massachusetts (BB-59) and aircraft carriers USS Wasp (CV-7) and USS Bunker Hill (CV-17). The shipyard is located on what was known since the eighteenth century as Quincy Neck, a geographical feature now obscured by landfill and piers. The Fore River Shipyard is also widely believed to be the origin of the graffiti character known throughout the world as Kilroy, peeking over a bulkhead proclaiming "Kilroy Was Here".

Quincy Point was formerly a hub for immigrants from Italy and Lebanon. While many of these people still remain, today it is a very diverse neighborhood with many people of Irish, African and Asian descent.

A famous former resident of Quincy Point is Dick Dale, known as the "King of Surf Guitar" and a major influence in the development of heavy metal rock music. Of Lebanese and Polish heritage, Dale introduced complex Middle Eastern melodies and rhythms into the rock and roll repertoire during the early 1960s. Dick Dale was raised on Shea Street near Southern Artery in Quincy Point and resided in Twentynine Palms, California until his death in 2019.

== Landmarks ==
Quincy Point has several small beaches fronting the Town River, including Mound Street Beach and Avalon Beach. Its main recreation facilities are Fore River Field, an athletic complex, and Monroe Playground.

The original market of the Stop & Shop supermarket chain was on the corner of Southern Artery and McGrath Highway; the chain still has a supermarket on the site.

The United States Naval Shipbuilding Museum located at the Fore River Shipyard, features the USS Salem (CA-139), a preserved heavy cruiser which is open to the public.

In January, 2008, The Patriot Ledger newspaper reported that the 328-foot (100 m) tall "Goliath" shipbuilding crane located at the Fore River Shipyard - once the tallest maritime construction crane in the world, and for decades a landmark visible for miles - would be dismantled and sold to Daewoo Shipbuilding & Marine Engineering of South Korea and relocated to Mangalia, Romania. The dismantlement of the giant structure began in July 2008 but was halted on August 14 following a partial collapse that resulted in the death of ironworker Robert Harvey. Work on the crane's removal stopped for two months while local and federal officials investigated the accident, but later resumed and was completed in early 2009. As a result of their investigation, the U.S. Occupational Safety and Health Administration issued fines totalling $68,000 on January 13, 2009. A barge carrying the crane was christened the USS Harvey in honor of the fallen worker and left the shipyard on March 7, 2009, en route to Romania.

Quincy Point is noteworthy for its religious diversity, including St. Joseph's Roman Catholic Church, Quincy Point Congregational Church, Glad Tidings Assemblies of God and a Portuguese-language Assemblies of God parish, all on Washington Street. The neighborhood also has the Thousand Buddha Temple, run by the Budhi Siksa Society, and the Islamic Center of New England mosque, New England's oldest mosque. Beth Israel Synagogue's was southeastern Massachusetts' oldest surviving synagogue until it closed in 2008; the building has since been renovated and houses a Baptist church.

== Transportation ==
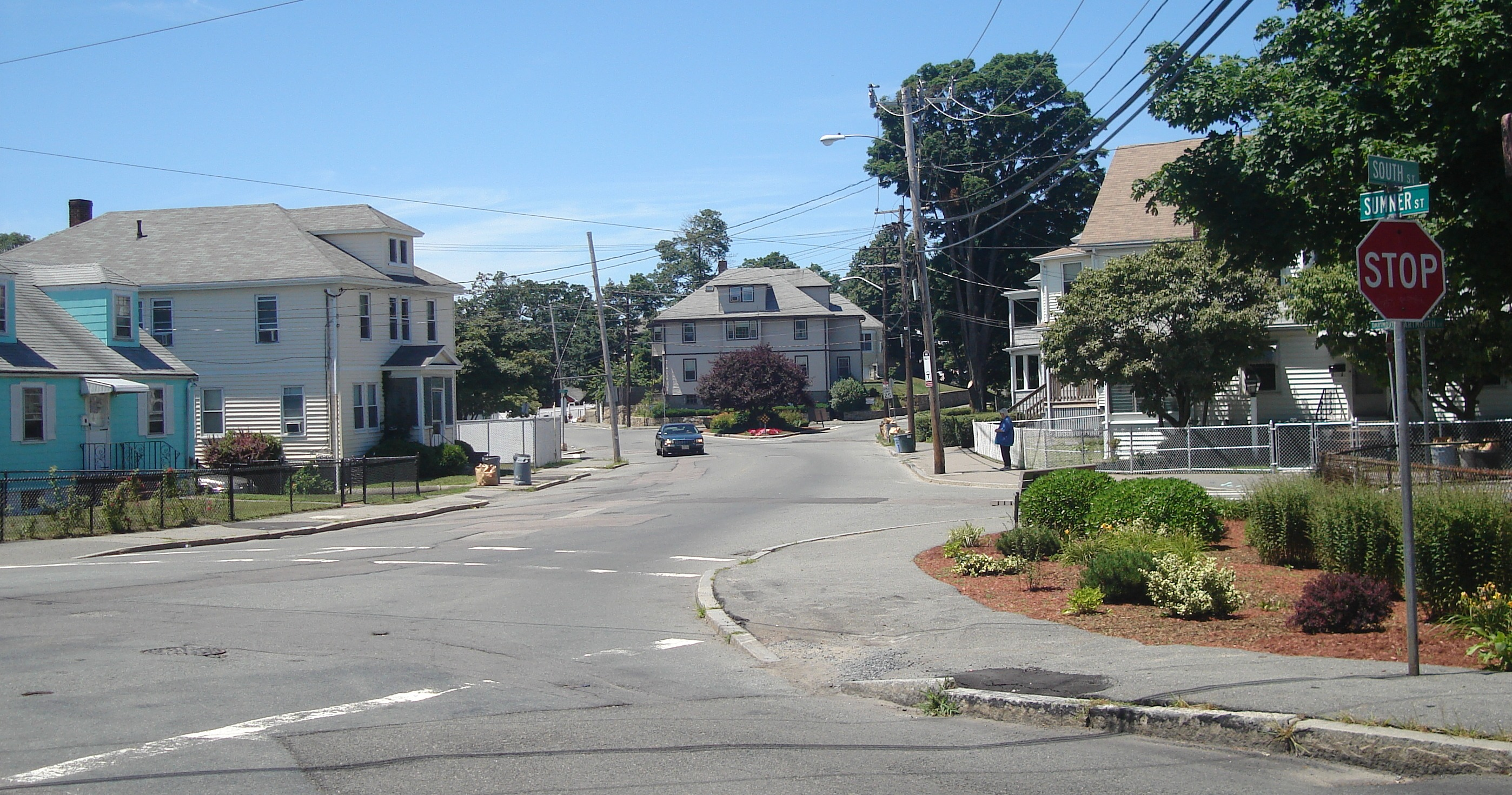
Sumner Street at South Street in Quincy Point

Quincy Point is traversed by two Massachusetts state highways and is served by several bus routes.

State highway Route 53 enters Quincy Point from Braintree as Quincy Avenue, turns north at Southern Artery and ends at Washington Street, intersecting Route 3A.

State highway Route 3A enters Quincy Point from Bridge Street, Weymouth crossing Weymouth Fore River on the Fore River Bridge, entering Washington Street at Fore River rotary. Following Washington Street, Route 3A intersects Route 53 and turns north following Southern Artery toward Hancock Street, North Quincy and Dorchester.

MBTA bus Routes 220 (Hingham Center) and 222 (East Weymouth) serve Washington Street out of the Quincy Center Red Line subway station. MBTA bus Route 225 serves Quincy Avenue from Quincy Center station to Weymouth Landing.

MBTA contractor Harbor Express offered daily passenger ferry service from Quincy Point to Boston, but closed at the end of 2013 because of a deteriorating pier, which the MBTA declined to repair.

== Education ==
The neighborhood is serviced by Point Webster Middle School off of Washington Street and Marshall Elementary School on Southern Artery. Graduates of Point Webster attend Quincy High School, located in Quincy Center.

St. Joseph's Parochial School, a Catholic-run K-8 school operated by St. Joseph's Parish, was the last parochial school in the neighborhood; it closed in 2006 due to declining enrollment attributed to the abuse scandals in the Archdiocese of Boston.
