= Fore River Apprentice School =

Coordinates: 42°14′36.08″N 70°58′32.31″W

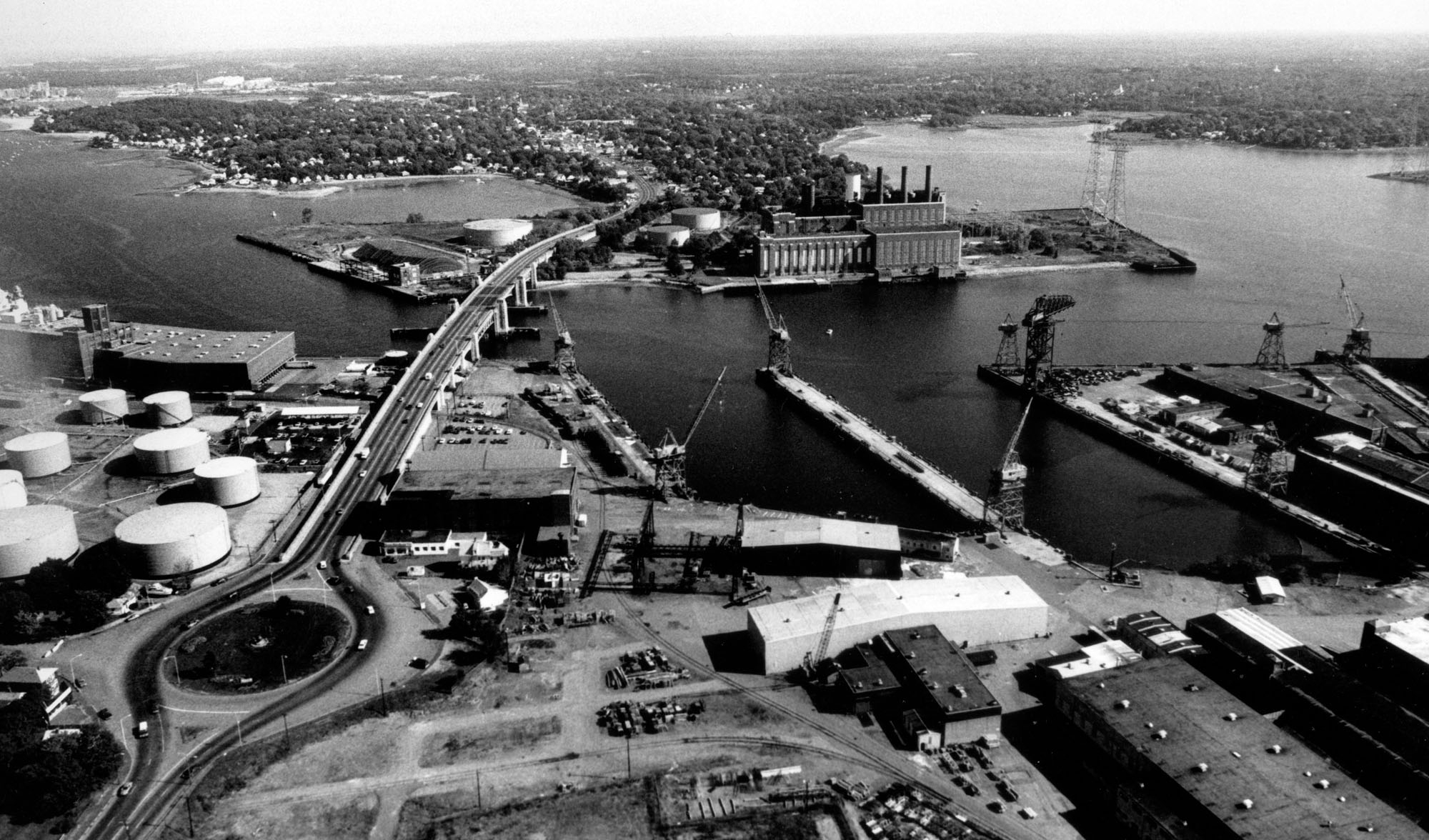
- A 1987 image of the yard with the former apprentice school building in the foreground

Information
- School type: Trade school
- Established: 1916
- Closed: 1984

The Fore River Apprentice School was a trade school operated by the owners of the Fore River Shipyard that specialized in the training of personnel in shipbuilding. It was operational from 1916 to around 1984, and trained at least 2,500 men in the trade of shipbuilding.
