= Goliath (Mangalia) =

Coordinates: 43.7957°N 28.5710°E

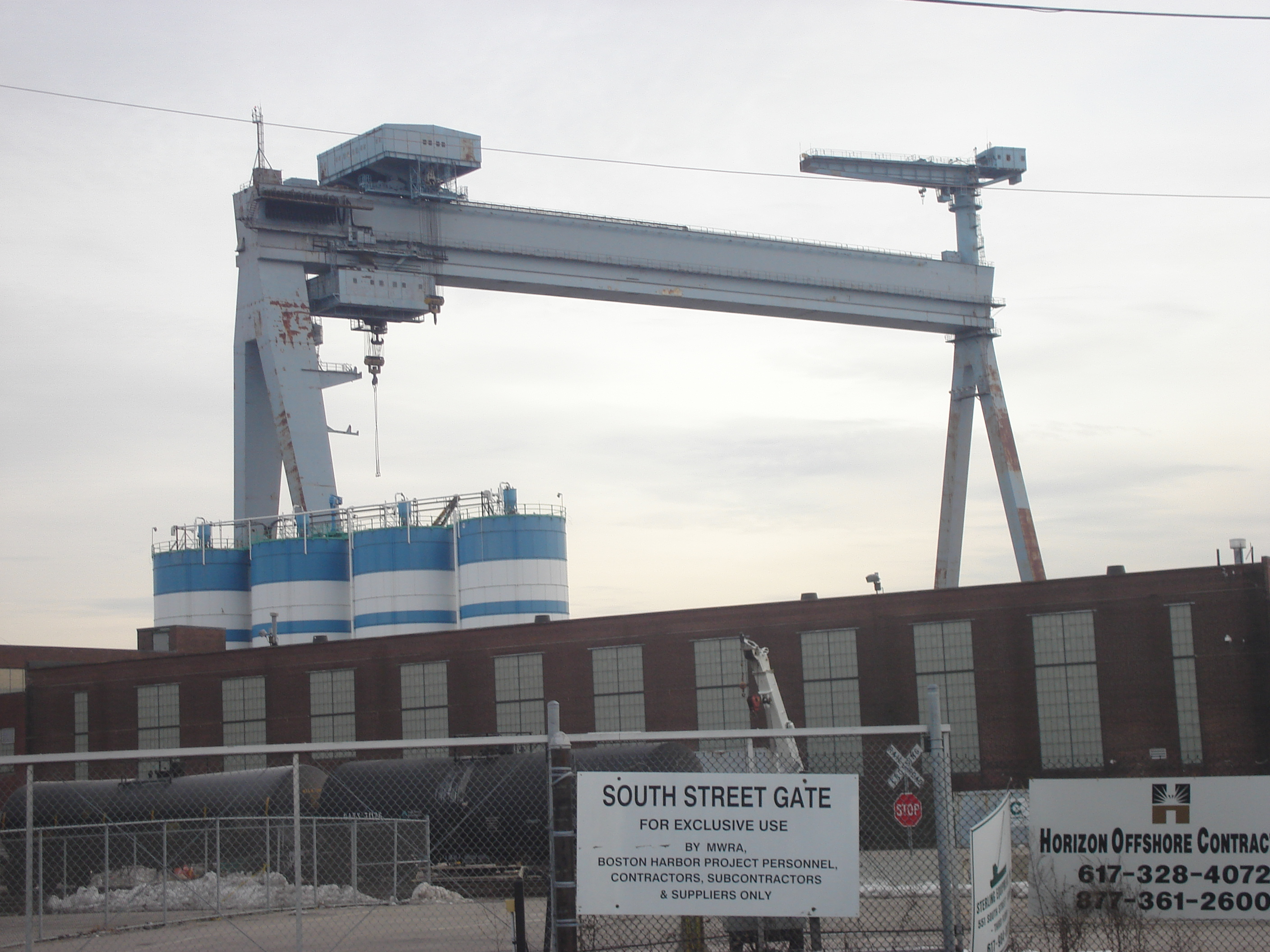
Goliath crane, January 2008

Goliath is the name of a crane that is currently located at the Mangalia shipyard in Mangalia, Romania. Formerly, it was part of the Fore River Shipyard in Quincy, Massachusetts.

== History ==
An important facility at the Fore River Shipyard was the Goliath crane, at one point the second largest shipbuilding crane in the world. Constructed in 1975 by MAGUE- Construções Metalomecânicas, SA, an important metalworking portuguese company, for building LNG tankers, the crane was a prominent part of the harbor skyline for over thirty years. In early 2008, the 328-foot (100 m) tall crane located at the former shipyard was sold to Daewoo-Mangalia Heavy Industries S. A., a joint-venture company of Daewoo Shipbuilding & Marine Engineering Co., Ltd. of South Korea and former state shipyard 2 Mai Mangalia S. A. of Romania, which dismantled it in 2008 for relocation to Mangalia, Romania.

On August 14, 2008, ironworker Robert Harvey was killed when a portion of the Goliath crane collapsed during dismantlement. Work on the crane's removal was halted for two months while local and federal officials investigated the accident, but the work later resumed and was completed in early 2009. As a result of their investigation, on January 13, 2009 the U.S. Occupational Safety and Health Administration imposed fines totalling $68,000. A barge carrying the crane was christened the USS Harvey in honor of the fallen worker and left the shipyard on March 7, 2009 en route to Romania.

The August 2008 fatal incident was preceded by two other deaths involving demolition of the main gantry crane at the shipyard on January 26, 2005. The earlier incident resulted in an OSHA ruling against Testa Corporation of Lynnfield, Massachusetts, including a proposed $60,400 fine. Following the 2005 collapse, violations involving improper cleanup and removal of asbestos found in debris left by the accident resulted in a $75,000 penalty imposed against Testa by the Massachusetts Department of Environmental Protection.
