= SS Constitution =

Ocean liner

- SS Constitution in the Canary Islands

History

United States
- Name: 1951–1974: Constitution; 1974–1982: Oceanic Constitution; 1982–1997: Constitution
- Owner: 1951–1974: American Export Lines; 1974–1979: Atlantic Far East Lines; 1980–1982: American Hawaii Cruises; 1982–1996: American Global Line; 1996–1997: American Hawaii Cruises
- Port of registry: 1951–1974: New York, United States; 1980–1997: Honolulu, United States
- Builder: Bethlehem Steel Corporation's Fore River Shipyard, Quincy, Massachusetts, US
- Yard number: 1619
- Laid down: 1950
- Launched: September 16, 1950
- Completed: 1951
- Maiden voyage: June 25, 1951
- In service: 1951
- Out of service: 1997
- Identification: IMO number: 5078882
- Fate: Sank while under tow to shipbreakers on November 17, 1997

General characteristics (as built)
- Type: Ocean liner
- Tonnage: 23,754 GRT; 11,229 NRT; 7,250 t DWT
- Length: 208.01 m (682 ft 5 in)
- Beam: 27.18 m (89 ft 2 in)
- Draft: 9.20 m (30 ft 2 in)
- Installed power: 2 × Bethlehem Steel Corporation steam turbines; 40456 kW
- Speed: 23 knots (43 km/h; 26 mph)
- Capacity: 1,000 passengers

General characteristics (after 1959 refit)
- Type: Cruise ship
- Tonnage: 23,754 GRT
- Capacity: 395 passengers

General characteristics (after 1974 refit)
- Capacity: 950 passengers

General characteristics (after 1980 refit)
- Tonnage: 20,221 GRT
- Capacity: 1,073 passengers

SS Constitution was an ocean liner owned by American Export Lines, sister ship of SS Independence. Both were constructed in the United States and made their maiden voyages in 1951.

== History ==
SS Constitution on a visit to Haifa on March 10, 1953

Constitution was constructed at Bethlehem Steel Corporation's Fore River Shipyard in Quincy, Massachusetts, and commissioned in 1951.

According to noted naval historian Peter Knego, she was designed by famous industrial designer Richard Dreyfus. He who also designed the famous art deco Mercury Train for the 20th Century Limited and Fair. the Trylon and Perisphere for the 1939 New York World's Fair. She was considered radical for her time, with sleek Art Moderne styling and rakish funnels.

She started her long career sailing on the New York City-Genoa-Naples-Gibraltar route to Europe. Following service on American Export's "Sunlane" cruise to Europe in the 1950s and 1960s, the two ships sailed for American Hawaii Cruises and American Global Line for many years in the 1980s and 1990s. U.S. ships with U.S. crews meeting the criteria of the Passenger Services Act were able to cruise the Islands without sailing to a foreign port.

SS Constitution in Hawaii

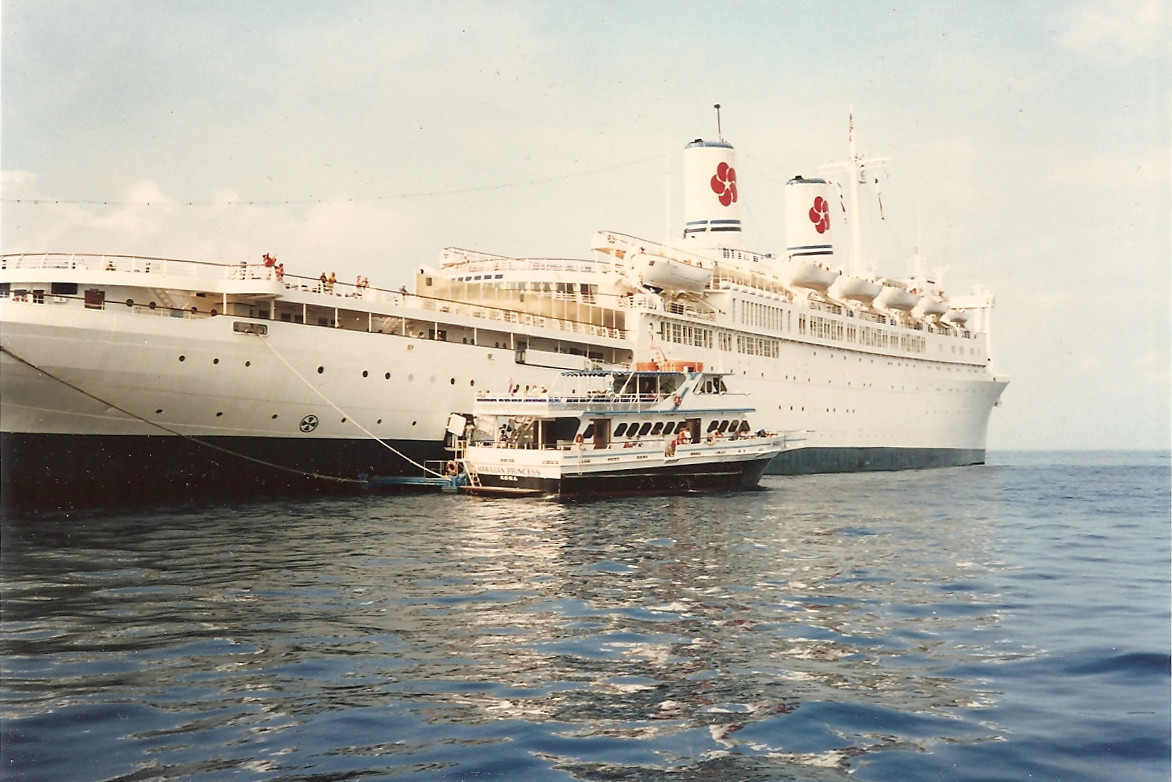
SS Constitution in Hawaii, August 1986

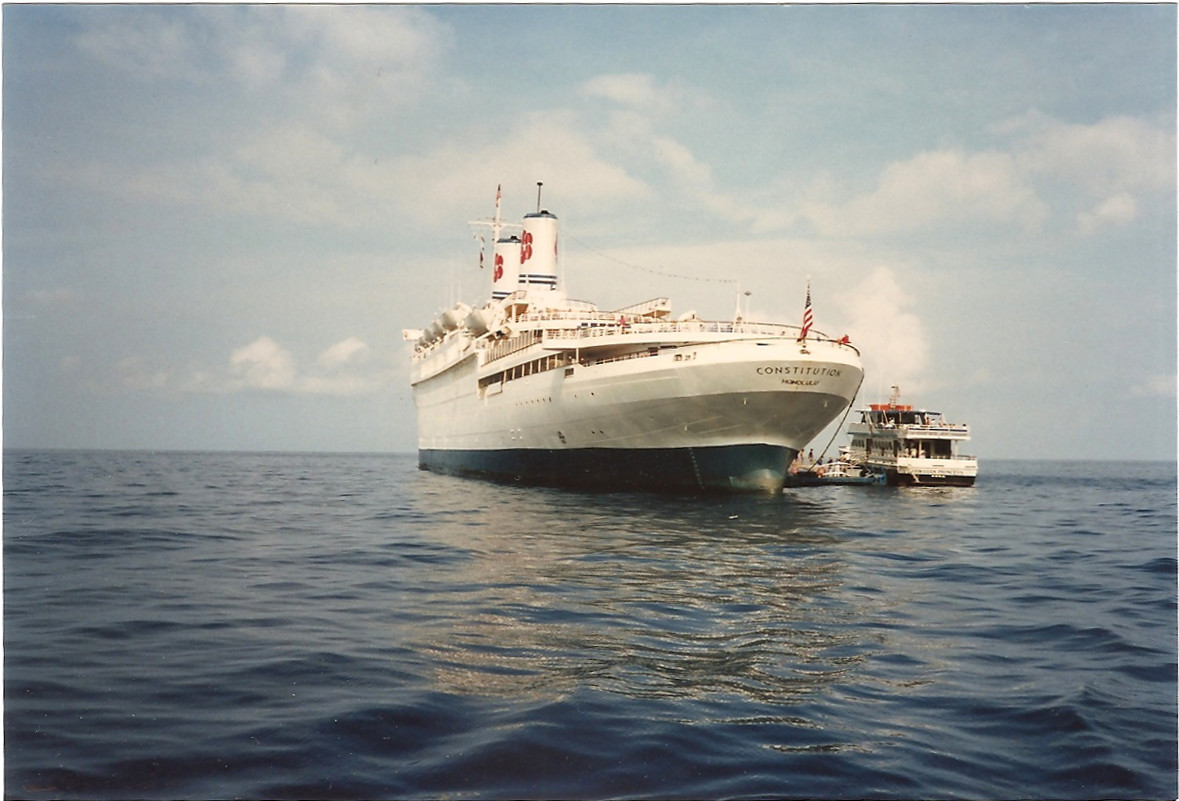
SS Constitution in Hawaii, August 1986

Constitution was retired in 1995; while under tow to be scrapped, the liner sank 800 miles (1300 km) north of the Hawaiian Islands on November 17, 1997. The exact location of the wreck has yet to be discovered.

== In popular culture ==
Constitution was featured in several episodes of the situation comedy I Love Lucy starring Lucille Ball and Desi Arnaz, starting with episode, "Bon Voyage," aired January 16, 1956. Lucy Ricardo missed the ship and had to be ferried by air by a then-novel helicopter.

American movie actress Grace Kelly sailed aboard Constitution from New York to Monaco for her wedding to Prince Rainier in 1956.

Constitution was featured in the 1957 film, An Affair to Remember starring Cary Grant and Deborah Kerr. Former President Harry S. Truman and his wife Bess sailed back to New York from Europe on the Constitution in the summer of 1958. The ship was also featured in the beginning and end of an episode of the Naked City TV series titled "No Naked Ladies in Front of Giovanni's House!" aired April 17, 1963. The ship also featured prominently in the Magnum, P.I. television series episode titled "All Thieves on Deck" aired January 30, 1986.

== Sinking ==
The SS Constitution was retired from the American Hawaii Cruises fleet in 1995 and had fallen into disrepair by 1997. On November 17, 1997, the ship was being towed to a scrapping shipyard to be dismantled when it sank about 800 miles north of Hawaii.
