= SS Independence =

US built and flagged ocean liner

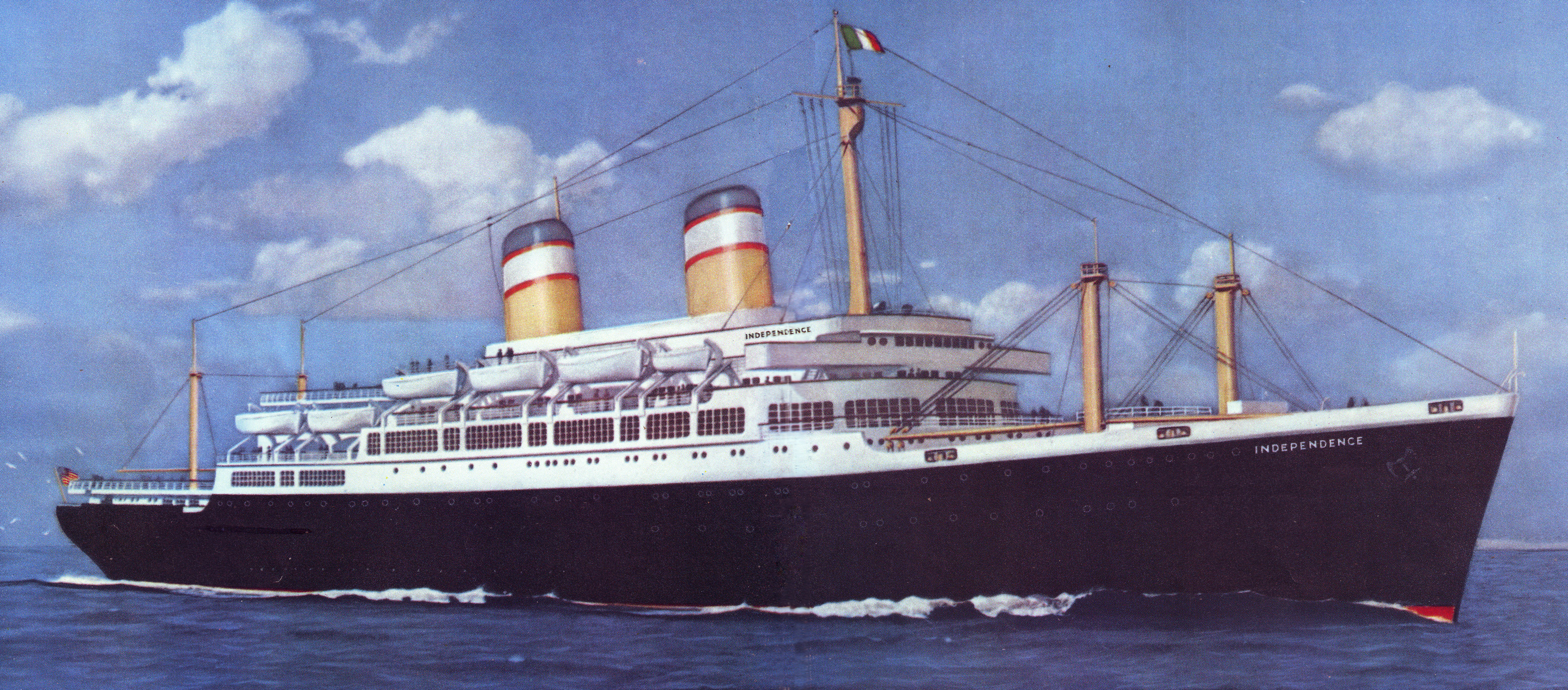
- SS Independence 1951

History
- Name: 1951–1974: Independence; 1974: Oceanic Independence; 1974–1975: Sea Luck I; 1975–1982 Oceanic Independence; 1982–2006: Independence; 2006–2009: Oceanic; 2009–2011: Platinum II
- Owner: 1951–1974: American Export Lines; 1974–1979: Atlantic Far East Lines; 1979–1982: American Hawaii Cruises; 1982–1996: American Global Line; 1996–2001: American Hawaii Cruises; 2001–2003: United States Maritime Administration; 2003–2005: Norwegian Cruise Line; 2005–2009: California Manufacturing Corp
- Operator: 1951–1969: American Export Lines; 1969–1974: laid up; 1974–1976: Atlantic Far East Lines; 1976–1980: laid up/rebuilt; 1980–1982: American Hawaii Cruises; 1982–1996: American Global Line; 1996–2001: American Hawaii Cruises; 2001–2008: laid up
- Port of registry: 1951–1974: New York, United States; 1974–1979: Panama City, Panama; 1979–2009: Honolulu, United States
- Ordered: 1950
- Builder: Bethlehem Steel Corporation, Quincy, Massachusetts, USA
- Yard number: 1618
- Laid down: 1950
- Launched: June 3, 1950
- Completed: 1951
- Acquired: January 22, 1951
- Maiden voyage: February 10, 1951
- In service: 1951–1969, 1974–1976, 1980–2001
- Out of service: 2001
- Identification: IMO number: 5160180
- Fate: Grounded and subsequently broken up off Alang, India; 2010-2011
- Notes: One of the last US-flagged liners

General characteristics (as built)
- Type: Ocean liner
- Tonnage: 23,719 GRT; 11,166 NRT; 7,250 DWT
- Length: 208.01 m (682.45 ft)
- Beam: 27.18 m (89.17 ft)
- Draft: 9.20 m (30.18 ft)
- Decks: 12
- Installed power: Two Bethlehem Steel Corporation steam turbines; 40,456 kW (combined)
- Speed: 22 knots (41 km/h; 25 mph)
- Capacity: 1,000 passengers

General characteristics (after 1959 refit)
- Type: Cruise ship
- Tonnage: 23,754 GRT
- Capacity: 395 passengers

General characteristics (after 1974 refit)
- Capacity: 950 passengers

General characteristics (after 1980 refit)
- Tonnage: 20,221 GRT
- Capacity: 1,073 passengers

SS Independence was an American built passenger liner, which entered service in February 1951 for American Export Lines. Originally, she plied a New York-Mediterranean route, specializing in a high-end clientele, sailing one way while her sister ship, SS Constitution, plied the route the opposite. Starting in 1980 she sailed as a cruise ship. She was shortly joined by her similarly graceful counter sterned sibling, the pair sharing the Hawaiian islands together for the better part of two decades until their retirements.

Between 1974 and 1982 Independence sailed as Oceanic Independence for Atlantic Far East Lines and American Hawaii Cruises, before reverting to the original name. Independence was then operated by American Global Line between 1982 and 1996, and again American Hawaii Cruises until being laid up in San Francisco in 2001.

In 2006 the ship was renamed Oceanic and, after being mothballed for seven years, left San Francisco for Singapore on February 8, 2008. That destination was later changed to Dubai, and in 2009 the aged liner left there under tow as the Platinum II for the shipbreaking yards in Alang, India. After having been turned away from those scrap yards due to hazardous materials on board, the then 58-year-old ship was grounded off Alang. There, the rusting ship's hull broke in two aft of the smokestacks (making refloating impossible) and was scrapped on the spot.

== Specifications ==
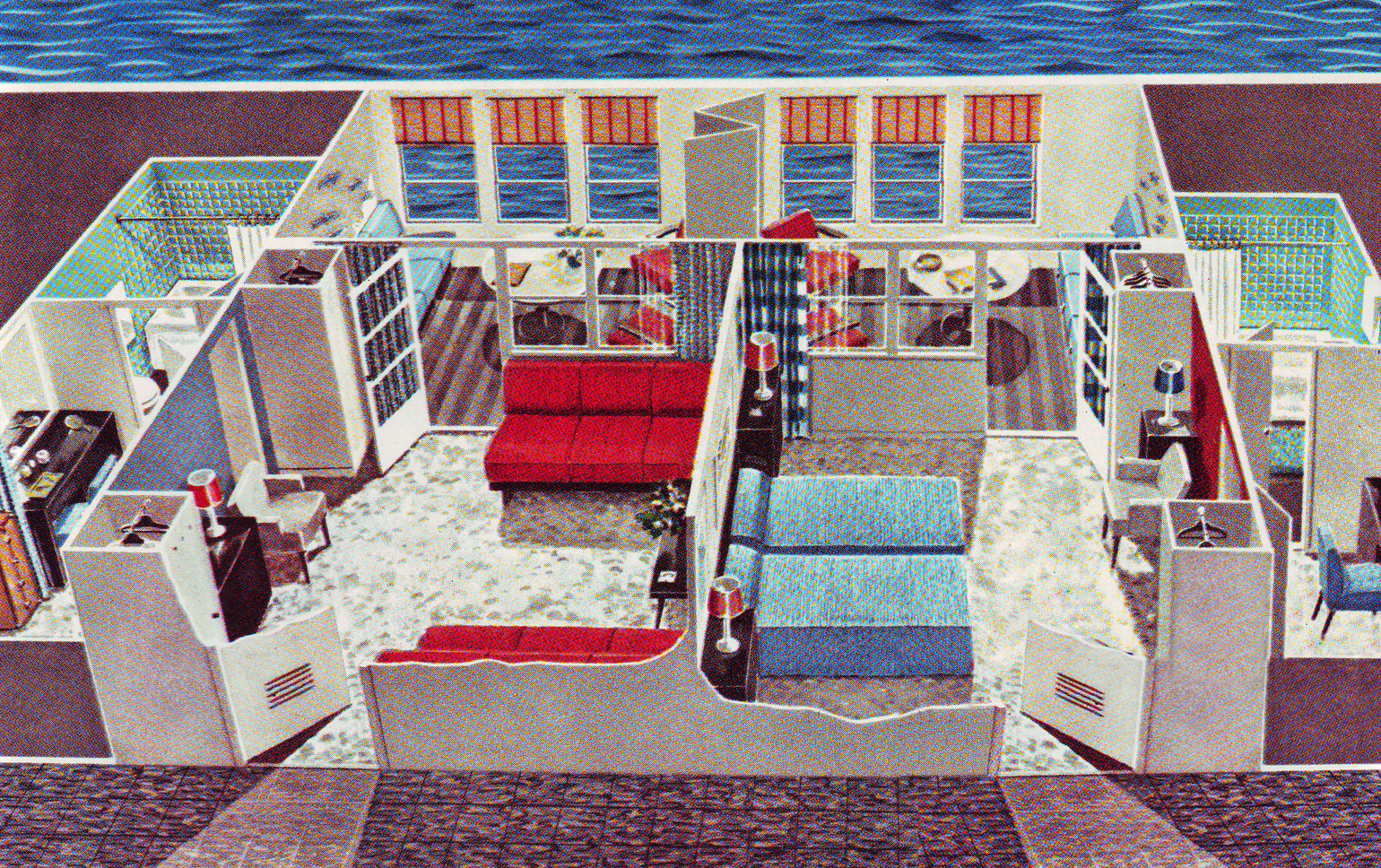
A "Penthouse Suite", 1951

Independence measured 683 feet (208 m) in length and 23,719 gross register tons under the US measurement system; under European measurement rules both ships would have been around 29,500 GRT. Capable of cruising at 26 knots, the liner accommodated 1,000 passengers, and was designed to accommodate 5,000 soldiers during wartime. According to Life magazine, "It will house passengers in Henry Dreyfuss-designed cabins, apartments, and 'penthouses,' keep their shipboard spirits up with branches of Fifth Avenue shops, handsome public rooms and bars decorated with old tattoo designs, collections of ships in bottles and Early American silver. Late American devices include 125 feet (38 m) of picture windows in the observation lounge, polarized glass in portholes to control light and glare, and bedside telephones from which a passenger can phone anyone within 5,000 miles."

== Service history ==
=== American Export Lines ===
SS Independence, 23,719 GRT, and the 23,754 GRT, SS Constitution were built by Bethlehem Steel Corporation in yard 1618 of its Fore River Shipyard in Quincy Massachusetts for the American Export Lines to operate on the US Mediterranean service. Launched on June 3, 1950, and completed January 1951, the new liner's first master was Captain Hugh Lee Switzer (1898–1991), former captain SS La Guardia, who held that post from 1951 to 1964. Both the Independence and the Constitution sported black hulls and American export lines funnel colors.

SS Independence underway

On February 10, 1951, Independence departed from North River Pier 84 at the foot of West 44th St in New York on a 53-day, 13,000 plus mile maiden voyage cruise to the Mediterranean during which the ship visited 22 ports in Spain, Morocco, Algeria, Sicily, Italy, Greece, Turkey, Lebanon, Cyprus, Israel, France, Gibraltar and Portugal before returning to New York on April 4. (Note: Itinerary: New York: Sat, Feb 10, 1951, Madeira: Fri., Feb.16, Casablanca: Sat. Feb.17 (for Marrakesh, Rabat, Fez, and Meknes), Cadiz: Mon, Feb.19 (for Seville, Granada, and the Alhambra), Gibraltar: Tue, Feb. 20, Tangier: Tue, Feb. 20, Malaga: Wed, Feb. 21, Algiers: Feb. 22, (for the Kasbah), Palermo: Sat, Feb. 24 (for Monreale), Naples: Sun. Feb. 25 (for Pompeii, Amalfii, and Sorrento), Athens: Tue, Feb, 27 (for the Parthenon and Acropolis), Haifa: Thu. Mar.1 (for Israel: Tel-Aviv, The Holy Land, Nazareth, Tiberias, Capernaum, Jerusalem-in-Israel, Mt. Carmel), Larnaca: Sun. Mar. 4 (Cyprus), Beirut: Mon. Mar. 5, (for Damascus, Baalbeck, Jerusalem-in-Hashemite-Transjordan, Bethlehem, Mount of Olives), Alexandria:Thu. Mar. 8, (for Cairo, the Pyramids, and Luxor), Istanbul: Thu. Mar. 15, Naples: Mon. Mar. 19 (for Capri, Rome, and Florence), Genoa: Thu. Mar. 22 (for Rapallo, Santa Margherita, Portofino and the Italian Riviera), Cannes: Sat. Mar. 24 (for Nice, Monte Carlo, Grasse, and the French Riviera), Barcelona: Mon. Mar. 26, Palma: Tue. Mar. 27 (Capital of the Balearic Islands), Gibraltar: Wed. Mar. 28, Lisbon: Thu. Mar. 29 (for Cinfra, Beiem, Estoril and Fatima), New York: Wed. Apr. 4, 11:00 AM.) Independence's first regular non-cruise transatlantic sailing departed New York for Genoa on April 12 although that US-Italy service was later changed to run between New York and Naples. In 1959 both ships were sent to Newport News where their forward superstructure was moved 22 feet forward and lifted up by one deck in order to increase First Class passenger capacity by more than 100 berths and altered overall accommodations to 484 First Class, 350 Cabin Class, and 254 Tourist Class passengers. This reconstruction resulted in the loss of half of the glass-enclosed promenade deck and the added height forward. During their heyday, many movies were made on board with such stars as Cary Grant and Deborah Kerr and many others. They also carried high-profile passengers such as President Harry Truman, Alfred Hitchcock, Walt Disney, even King Saud. Both ships continued on the Mediterranean run, however, like most Trans-Atlantic liners of the day, passenger numbers dropped and the service was suspended in 1967.

=== Atlantic Far East Line ===
In January 1974, both Independence and Constitution were sold to the Atlantic Far East Line Inc., Monrovia, being part of the massive C.Y. Tung group. Independence was renamed Oceanic Independence and after a refit commenced cruising with a new passenger capacity of 950 passengers. However, Constitution, renamed Oceanic Constitution, was laid up at Hong Kong on August 4, 1974. Oceanic Independence continued to cruise until being laid up as well at Hong Kong on January 17, 1976. In November that year there were rumors that the ship was to be sold to Shannon SA, of Panama, but this did not happen. Oceanic Independence remained laid up and was renamed Sea Luck I for a short time but soon after renamed Oceanic Independence once more.

=== American Hawaii Cruises ===
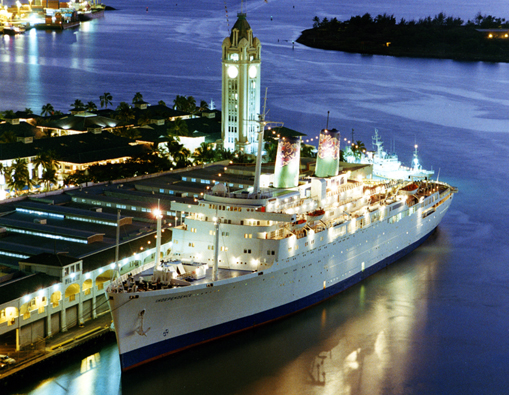
SS Independence at Honolulu in 2001

As they were no longer American-flagged ships, C.Y. Tung was not able to operate them within American waters. In 1979, however, both the U.S. Senate and House of Representatives approved their return to the States. In 1980 C.Y. Tung transferred Oceanic Independence to their newly established, US based American Hawaii Cruises Inc. After extensive repairs and a refit at the Kawasaki Dockyard Co. Ltd, Kobe Japan, Oceanic Independence was configured to accommodate 750 one class passengers and was listed as being 20,220 GRT. Oceanic Independence departed on a maiden cruise in June, 1980, operating 7-Day cruises around the Hawaiian Islands from Honolulu. On September 24, 1981, the cruise ship sustained minor damage off the coast of Nawiliwili, however passengers were safely taken ashore and flown home. After repairs in San Francisco the vessel returned to service. American Hawaii Cruises Inc became part of the American Global Line, Inc, in 1982 and restored the original name Independence to the liner once again.

With Independence having been successful in 1980, Oceanic Constitution was refitted in Taiwan and departed for Honolulu with a passenger capacity of 1,088 and listed at 20,199 GRT. There the cruise ship was transferred to the American Global Line, Inc, was rechristened by Princess Grace of Monaco under the ship's original name, Constitution, and commenced cruising out of Honolulu in June 1982. In 1984 passenger capacity was reduced to 800 and in 1987 both ships were officially reregistered in Honolulu. In 1994 Independence was withdrawn from service and headed to Newport News Shipbuilding and Dry dock Company for an extensive refit. In April 1996, however, American Hawaii Cruises decided to retire the then 46-year-old Constitution due to high running costs and required renovations. Laid up due to the company's financial problems, many of Constitution's parts were used on Independence. After the demise of Constitution, the older sister ship became the last US built ocean liner to sail under the American flag. Celebrations were held on board during Independence's 1,000th voyage in August 1999. With the 2001 bankruptcy of American Hawaii Cruises, the owners of the American Hawaii Line, Independence became the property of the US Maritime Administration and sailed from Honolulu to San Francisco, arriving on November 8, 2001 to be greeted and led by the fireboat Phoenix.

=== Norwegian Cruise Line ===
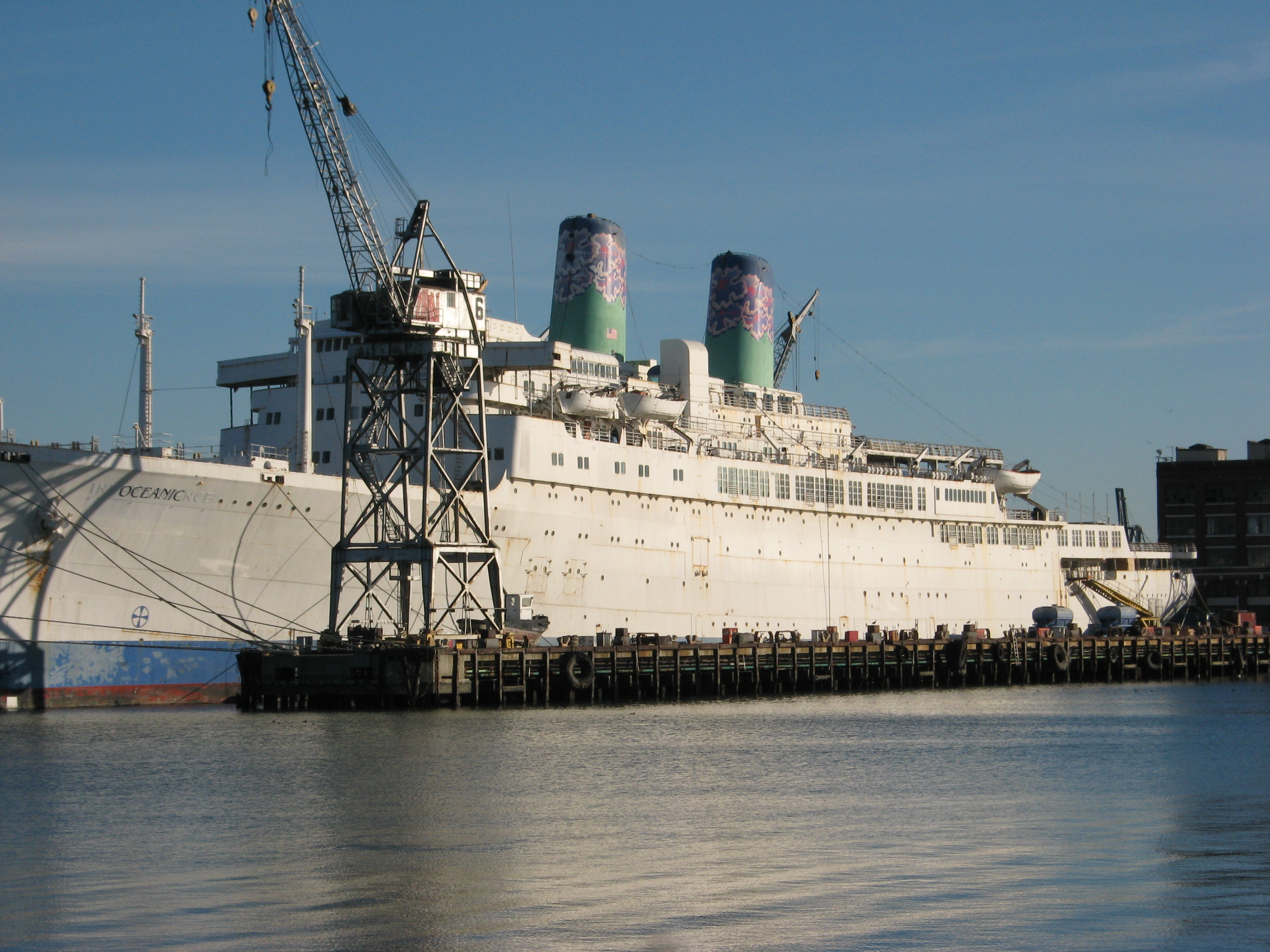
SS Oceanic laid up at Pier 70, San Francisco. Note the name Oceanic painted over the ship's original name of Independence.

In February 2003, Independence was sold at auction for US$4 million to Norwegian Cruise Line, which also acquired SS United States. At this time, NCL received permission to create US-flagged cruise operation to be named NCL America. (US flagging is a valuable competitive advantage, as the Passenger Service Act prohibits non-US lines from transporting passengers from one US port to another without stopping at a foreign port, and in particular it permits 7-day Hawaii cruises. As US flagging requires US-built ships, no other major cruise operation is US-flagged.)

In mid-2006, Independence was renamed Oceanic amid speculation that the veteran liner might be scrapped. In July 2007, Norwegian Cruise Line announced that Oceanic had been sold with later reports claiming the ship had been purchased by an American company.

== Final journey to Alang ==
=== Departure from San Francisco ===
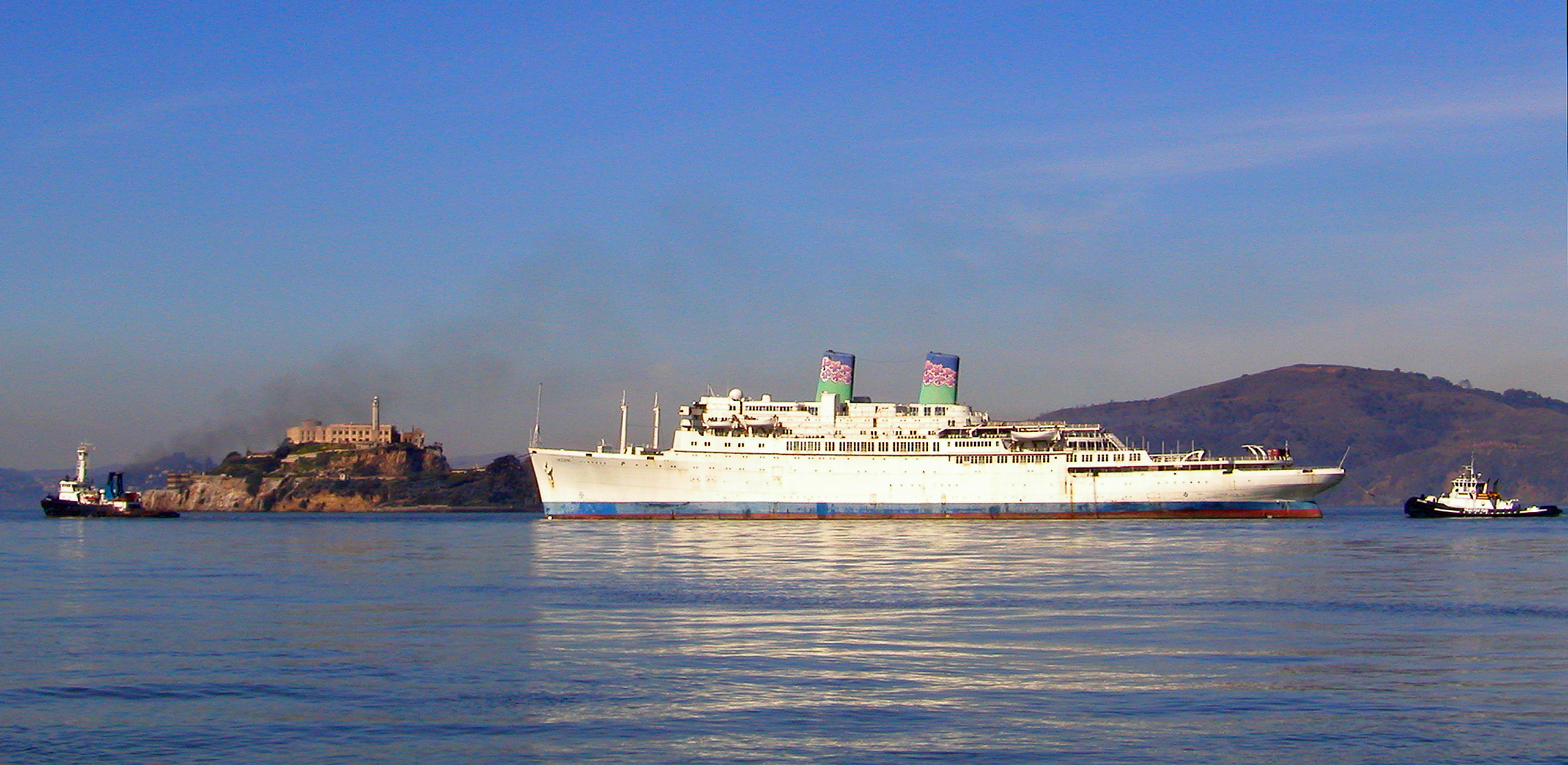
Oceanic departing San Francisco

Oceanic was towed out of San Francisco Bay on February 8, 2008 for Singapore. Rumors had been swirling that the ship was ultimately destined for a scrapyard in India or Bangladesh, but had been stopped due to a complaint filed by the United States Environmental Protection Agency that the ship was being towed to an overseas scrap yard.

Global Marketing Systems, the last owner of Oceanic, was fined $518,500 for exporting the ship for scrap without prior removal of toxins such as asbestos and PCBs.

=== Name change and departure to Alang ===
In 2009 Oceanic was illegally renamed Platinum II and departed Dubai for Alang, being towed by a tug Barakhoda. The tug apparently lost all power and setting the two vessels adrift some 25 km off Alang. Another tug was sent to assist Barakhoda and crew of nine.

=== Scrapping at Alang ===
In October 2009, a ship claiming to be the "SS Platinum-II" was turned away from the Alang breaker yard in India when it was discovered the ship was actually the former Oceanic. Indian authorities alleged that it had been renamed and supplied with falsified papers in order to evade regulations on toxic materials.

In a dramatic turn-around, the Ministry of Environment and Forests intervened and gave their approval, granting Platinum II permission to be beached at Alang's shipbreaking yard. After much controversy and with demands that the ship be returned to the U.S. for being illegally exported, Platinum II was abandoned at Gopnath in a region south of the Alang on the Gujarat coast. Although probably no more toxic than most ships built in the 1950s and 1960s, the vessel was deemed such for the minute amounts of radioactive materials found in the smoke detection systems and for the usual asbestos and PCBs contained in ships of that generation.

According to local sources, Platinum II was laying off shore with guards on board to protect the ship from looting and vandals. Also, reports of the hull being cracked (an unsubstantiated charge made by the ship's owners to urge the Gujarat Maritime Board to allow the ship to be beached in November) appeared to have some truth. The tug that delivered the ship into Gujarat waters had likely already been beached for scrapping, so another vessel would have been required to pull Platinum II off the embankment for the short trip to Alang.

=== Wrecked off Alang ===
After running aground in February 2010, mud had made it into Platinum II's cracked hull. Later news reports from India claimed the ship, aground and abandoned at Gopnath, some ten miles south of Alang, was beginning to suffer structural cracks and would never be able to be moved from there. In March 2010 the vessel's hull cracked aft of the accommodation (roughly at one third of the length from the stern) and the entire hull was lying at an angle of about 35 degrees. The ship was scrapped on the spot throughout the remainder of 2010 and the wreck was reportedly completely gone by January 2011.

While under investigation by the Gujarati anti-terrorist unit for smuggling radioactive, hazardous, and toxic waste to organized crime, the former Independence was looted in May–June 2010 during a cyclone.

== See also ==
- Ezra Drown, for the 19th Century SS Independence, wrecked off Baja California
- SS America (1939)
- SS Constitution
- SS Emerald
- SS France (1961)
- SS United States
