= George Fried =

American sea captain (1877–1949)

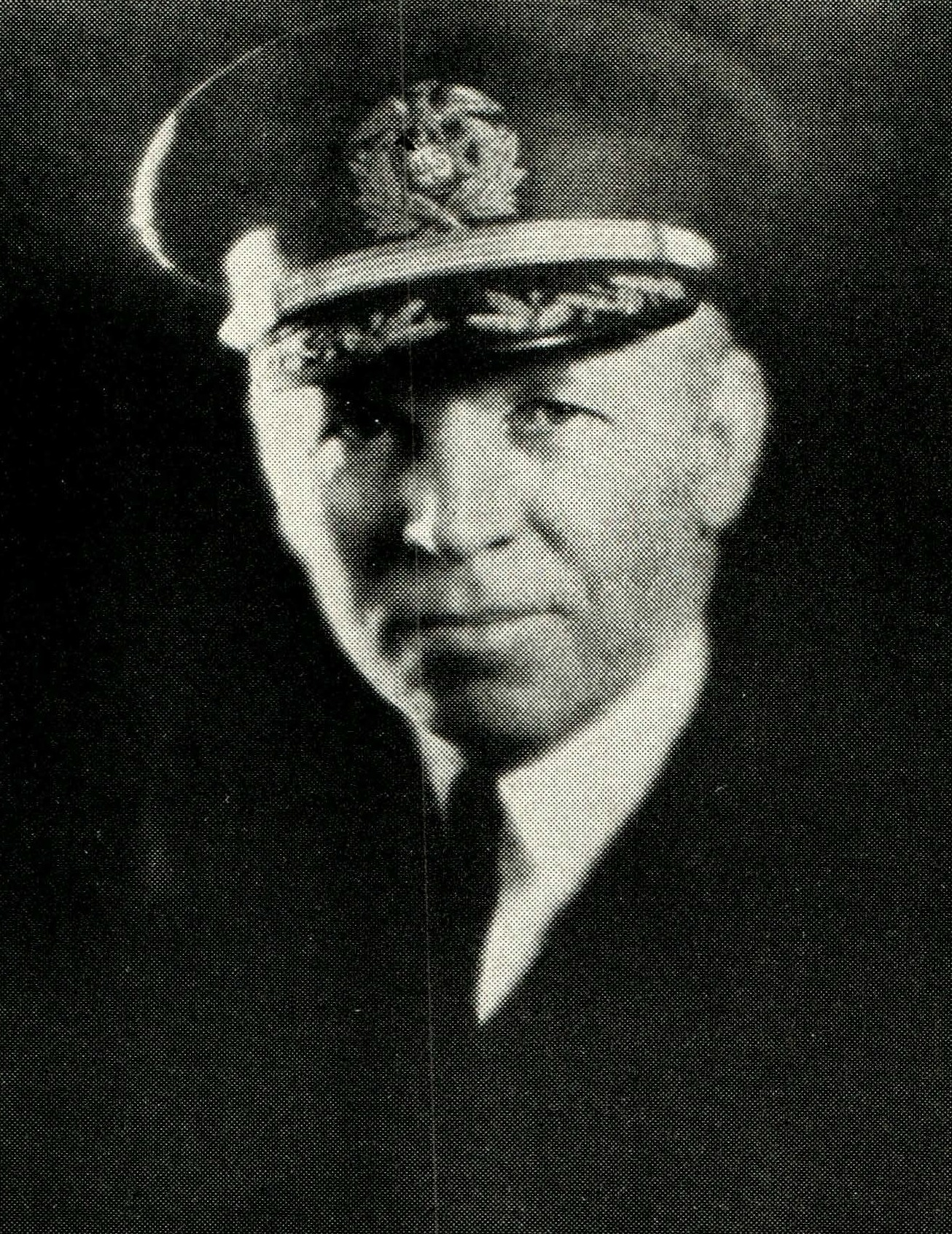
- Born: August 10, 1877; Worcester, Massachusetts, U.S.
- Died: July 25, 1949 (aged 71) Yonkers, New York, U.S.
- Allegiance: United States
- Branch: United States Army 1898–1900; United States Navy 1900–16, 1918–21; United States Merchant Marine 1922–46
- Service years: 1898–1946
- Rank: Captain
- Commands: USS Zuiderdijk (ID-2724); SS President Grant; SS President Roosevelt; USS America (ID-3006); SS Manhattan; SS Leviathan; SS Washington; Steamboat Inspection Supervisor, 1934
- Conflicts: Spanish–American War; World War I
- Awards: Navy Cross

George Fried, (August 10, 1877 – July 25, 1949) a sea captain with service in both the U.S. Navy and Merchant Marine, is best remembered for his valiant rescue of the crews of the British steamship Antinoe in 1926 while captaining the luxury liner SS President Roosevelt and three years later the Italian freighter Florida while in command of the luxury liner USS America. Both of the ships he captained during the rescues were owned by the large United States Lines. Fried became familiar to thousands of Americans when his syndicated column "My Thirty Years at Sea", which chronicled his life and ocean adventures, was featured in major newspapers beginning in 1929.

== Early life ==
Fried was born in Worcester, Massachusetts, on August 10, 1877, and attended the Belmont and Dix Street Schools. He worked on a local farm from ages twelve to fifteen, harvesting beets and corn, but from an early age had a desire to sail the seas. He entered Army service at the age of twenty-one during the period of the Spanish–American War and served from 1898 to 1900.

== Early naval career ==
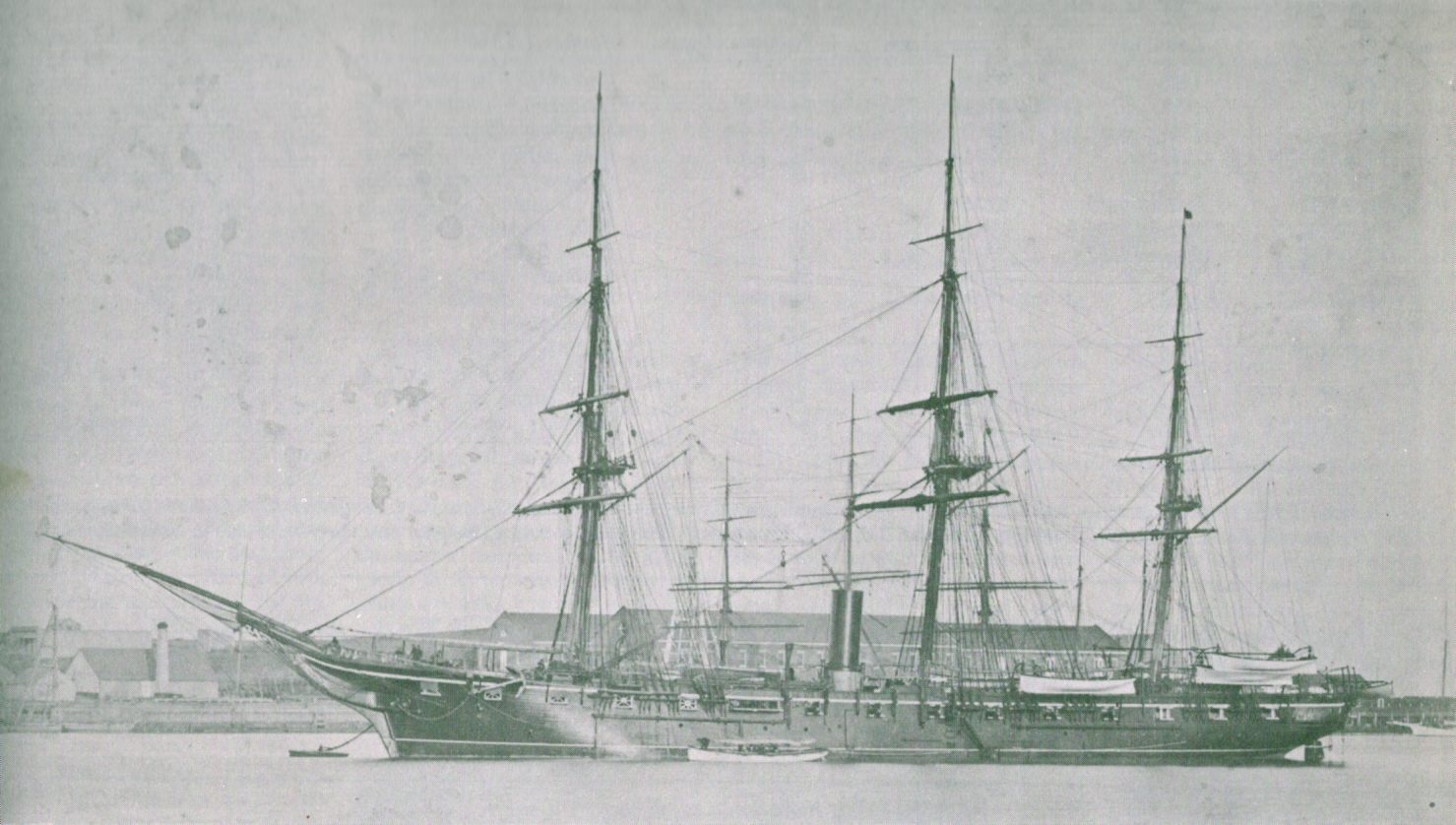
USS Hartford

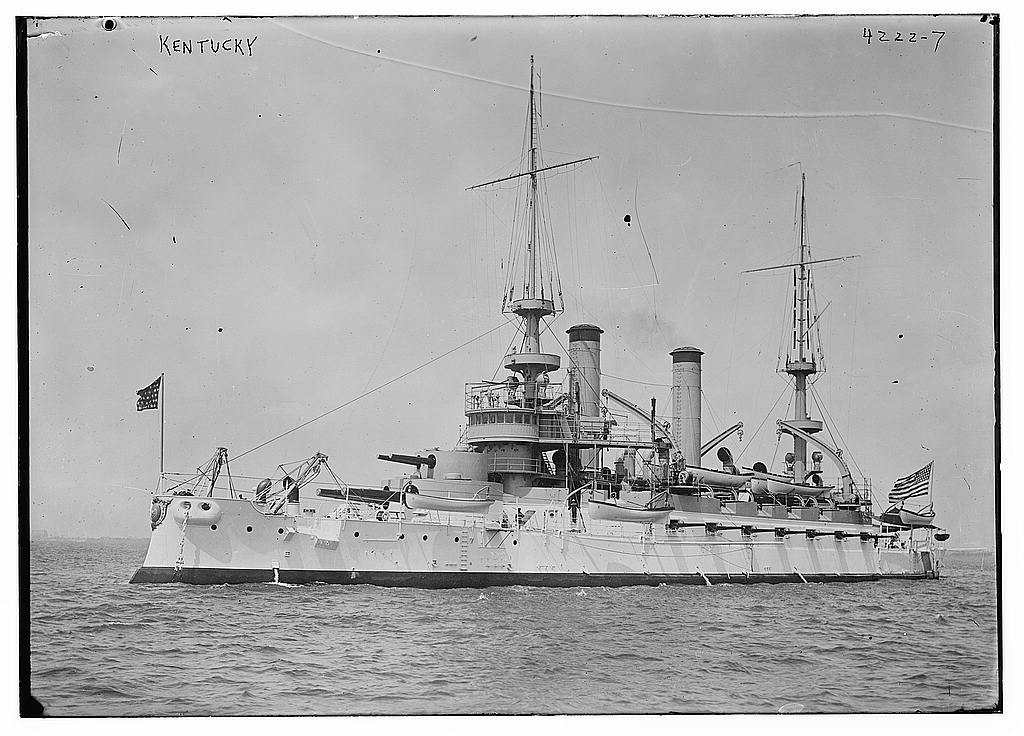
USS Kentucky circa 1905–08

After his brief stint with the Army, Fried enlisted in the U.S. Navy in 1900 in New York. His first naval assignment was with the historic USS Hartford, a 255-foot steam and sail-powered sloop of war, which had seen service in the Civil War. As a fledgling U.S. Naval seaman, he began service swabbing the Hartford's decks, working the coalroom, and trimming sails.

During many of the summers from 1900 to 1912, the Hartford took U.S. Naval Academy midshipmen on a cruise to gain hands on experience with essential seafaring skills. During several of these cruises, Fried worked in the deck area where navigation was being taught. In his spare time, he began to study navigational formulas and was assisted by officers, until he had begun to grasp the fundamentals of the science of navigation. During five years of service aboard the Hartford from 1900 to 1905, he progressed from ordinary seaman to coxswain, quartermaster, and finally chief quartermaster, with each position developing and refining what would become his remarkable navigation skills.

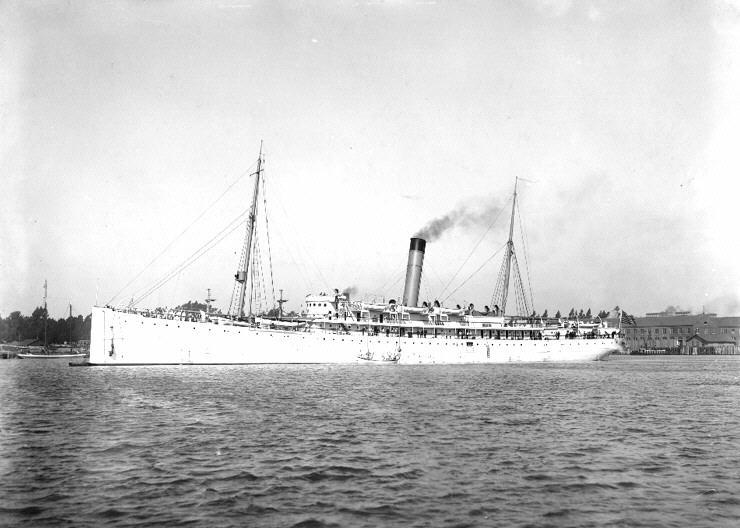
USS Solace

In 1916, after short rotations aboard various cruisers and battleships, Fried became third officer aboard the USS Solace (AH-2) as a member of the Merchant Marine. Solace was a 377-foot hospital ship and part of the Atlantic fleet.

After serving on the Solace, he was recalled by the Navy and became an ensign in the North Atlantic aboard the pre-dreadnought battleship USS Kentucky (BB-6). Fried served with the Navy between 1916 and 1921 and reached the rank of Lieutenant (junior grade) aboard the USS Petrel, a 188-foot gunboat. At the outbreak of World War I, Fried was promoted to full Lieutenant and placed in charge of the cargo ship USS Zuiderdijk as she carried supplies from New York to France.

== Mid-career and historic rescues ==
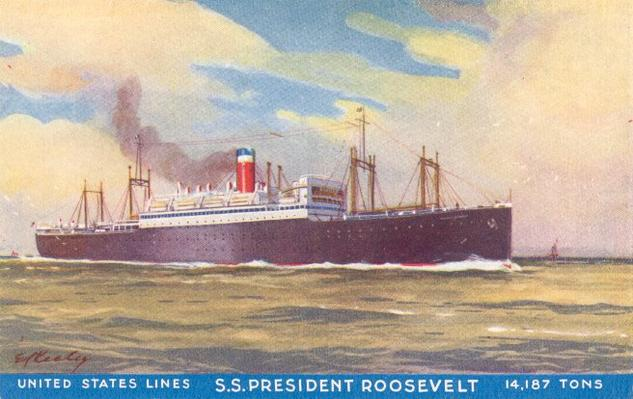
SS President Roosevelt, 1920s

Fried's service with the United States Lines after 1921 was as a member of the Merchant Marine. He served as chief officer on the United States Lines' luxury liner SS President Grant and briefly in this position as well on the USS America. He married Laura Parmenter on March 21, 1922, in New York.

In 1922, Fried was promoted to the captaincy of the luxury liner SS President Roosevelt. On January 20, 1926, with Fried as captain, Roosevelt received an SOS from the British steam cargo ship Antinoe. After several attempts amidst violent snowstorms and rough seas, Roosevelt succeeded in rescuing her entire crew of twenty-five by January 28. The rescue was made memorable by the Roosevelt's persistence in remaining with the sinking Antinoe despite rough seas, snow, and bitter cold. After completing the rescue of her crew, Roosevelt left the listing, damaged Antinoe abandoned with no electrical power. On her return to Hoboken Pier, Roosevelt was greeted by local dignitaries, including New Jersey Governor Harry Moore, who gave an address. Roosevelt's officers and crew were entertained by a band, received a twenty-one-gun salute, and were welcomed to New York by Mayor Jimmy Walker, after a stay at the Roosevelt Hotel and a ticker-tape parade. For his heroic efforts, Fried was awarded the Navy Cross and both he and members of the Roosevelt's crew were decorated by the British government.

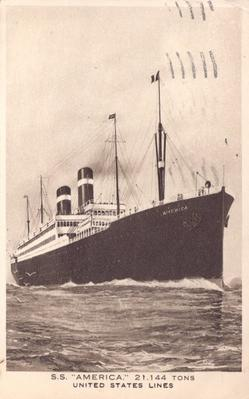
SS America

Fried took command of the SS America in 1928. Only three years after his previous rescue, while serving as captain of the SS America, Fried rescued the thirty-two man crew of the Italian steamship Florida in freezing weather and violent snow squalls. America was heading to New York from France. As she battled her way through a major storm, the liner picked up distress signals from Florida. Navigating with the aid of a radio direction finder, the America fixed a location on the Italian ship, and late the following afternoon on January 28, 1929, sighted the endangered vessel.

Pulling alongside of Florida's weather beam, America launched a lifeboat, commanded by her chief officer, Harry Manning, with an eight-man crew. Manning's crew rowed the lifeboat to within fifty feet of the listing Florida, and a line was thrown to the frantic crew of the freighter. One by one, men from the Italian ship came across the rope. By the time the Florida's captain had been pulled on board the lifeboat as the last man, winds were gale force, and the seas were rough and high. After rowing the lifeboat back to the America, her sailors helped haul aboard the survivors of the Florida using ladders, ropes, cargo nets, and two homemade breeches buoy. The breeches buoys were basically zip lines tied from America's large life raft containing the rescued crew of the Florida to the waiting America. Fried became a national hero when his account of the story was widely distributed by newspapers.

In 1931, Fried rescued Lew Aichers when his plane crashed fifteen miles off the coast of Ireland. On November 30, 1931, Fried took command of the United States Lines' SS Manhattan, launched from Camden, New Jersey. She was a 705-foot long, 30,000-ton merchantman. During his career with United States Lines, Fried also captained the SS Leviathan for three trips during the illness of her Captain A. B. Randall.

== Retirement ==
After nearly half a century with the Navy and Merchant Marine, George Fried retired in 1946. In retirement, he enjoyed reading, gardening, and spending time with his wife Laura. He died in Yonkers, New York, on July 25, 1949, and was buried at Mount Hope Cemetery at Hastings-on-Hudson, New York.
