= USS Orizaba =

United States Navy transport ship

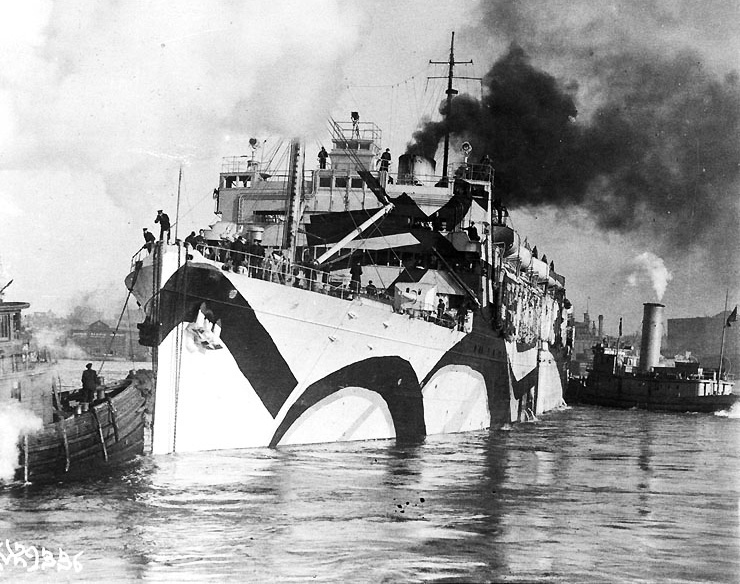
- USS Orizaba (ID–1536) departing New York via the North River for France in World War I (1918)

History

United States
- Name: USS Orizaba (ID-1536)
- Namesake: Orizaba, Veracruz, Mexico
- Builder: William Cramp & Sons
- Yard number: 435
- Launched: 26 February 1917 as Orizaba
- Acquired: 11 April 1918
- Commissioned: 27 May 1918
- Decommissioned: 4 September 1919
- In service: after 4 September 1919 as USAT Orizaba
- Out of service: 1920
- Fate: returned to Ward Line, 1920
- Name: SS Orizaba
- Owner: Ward Line
- Acquired: 1920
- Port of registry: (United States) New York
- In service: 1920
- Refit: 1924
- Identification: United States Official Number 216294; Code Letters LKJM (1920–34); Code Letters WECX (1934–41)
- Route: New York–Cuba–Spain, 1920–1921; New York–Cuba–Mexico, 1921–1939
- Out of service: 1939
- Fate: Chartered to United States Lines, 1939; Sold to War Department, 1941

United States
- Acquired: early 1941, by War Department
- In service: early 1941
- Out of service: March 1941
- Refit: April–May 1941, Bethlehem Steel Co.
- Acquired: 4 June 1941, by US Navy
- Commissioned: 15 June 1941
- Decommissioned: 23 April 1945
- Stricken: 20 July 1953
- Identification: Call sign: NUBY
- Honors and awards: 1 battle star, World War II
- Fate: To Brazilian Navy, 16 July 1945 at Tampa, Florida under Lend-Lease; Permanent transfer to Brazil, June 1953

Brazil
- Name: Duque de Caxias (U11)
- Namesake: Luís Alves de Lima e Silva, Duke of Caxias
- Acquired: 16 July 1945
- Commissioned: 16 July 1945
- Decommissioned: 13 April 1959
- Stricken: 1960
- Fate: Scrapped in 1963

General characteristics
- Tonnage: 6,937 gross tons (as USAT Orizaba)
- Displacement: 11,293 tons (as USS Orizaba)
- Length: 443 ft 3 in (135.10 m)
- Beam: 60 ft (18.3 m)
- Draft: 24 ft 4 in (7.42 m)
- Depth: 15 ft 7 in (4.75 m)
- Installed power: 4 steam turbines
- Propulsion: 2 screw propellers
- Speed: 16.5 knots (30.6 km/h)
- Range: 6,200 nautical miles (11,500 km)
- Capacity: 35,455 cubic feet (1,004.0 m^{3}), of which 13,107 cubic feet (371.1 m^{3}) refrigerated
- Troops: World War I: 3,100; 4,100 (after Armistice); World War II: 2,928
- Complement: 323 officers and enlisted
- Armament: World War I: 4 × 5" guns; 2 × 1 pounder; World War II: 2 × 5"/38 caliber Dual Purpose (DP) gun mounts; 4 × 3"/50 caliber DP gun mounts; as Duque de Caxias: 2 × 5"/38 caliber gun mounts; 12 × 20 mm AA gun mounts

USS Orizaba (ID-1536/AP-24) was a transport ship for the United States Navy in both World War I and World War II. She was the sister ship of Siboney but the two were not part of a ship class. In her varied career, she was also known as USAT Orizaba in service for the United States Army, and as SS Orizaba in interwar civilian service for the Ward Line, and as Duque de Caxias (U-11) as an auxiliary in the Brazilian Navy after World War II.

Orizaba made 15 transatlantic voyages for the navy carrying troops to and from Europe in World War I with the second-shortest average in-port turnaround time of all navy transports. The ship was turned over to the War Department in 1919 for use as army transport USAT Orizaba. After her service in World War I ended, Orizaba reverted to the Ward Line, her previous owners. The ship was briefly engaged in transatlantic service to Spain and then engaged in New York–Cuba–Mexico service until 1939, when the ship was chartered to United States Lines. While Orizaba was in her Ward Line service, American poet Hart Crane leapt to his death from the rear deck of the liner off Florida in April 1932.

In World War II the ship was requisitioned by the War Shipping Administration and again assigned to the War Department as USAT Orizaba. After completing one voyage as an Army transport, the ship was transferred to the U.S. Navy, where she was re-commissioned as USS Orizaba (AP-24). The ship made several transatlantic runs, was damaged in an air attack in the Allied invasion of Sicily, and made trips to South America. The transport also served in the Pacific Theatre, making several transpacific voyages, and one to the Aleutians.

In June 1945, Orizaba was transferred under Lend-Lease to the Brazilian Navy where she served as Duque de Caxias (U-11). In August 1945, the ship carried parts of the Brazilian Expeditionary Force from Naples back to Rio de Janeiro. It was badly damaged by a fire in 1947, but was repaired and remained in service. Permanently transferred to Brazil in 1953, Duque de Caxias was decommissioned in 1959 and scrapped in 1963.

== Description ==
Orizaba was 423 feet 0 inches (128.93 m) long between perpendiculars, with a beam of 60 feet 0 inches (18.29 m). She had a depth of 15 feet 7 inches (4.75 m) and a draft of 35 feet 0 inches (10.67 m). Propulsion was four steam turbines of 1,908 nhp driving twin screw propellers through single reduction gearing. She was fitted with 13,107 cubic feet (371.1 m^{3}) of refrigerated cargo space. The refrigerant was brine and insulation was by means of cork.

== World War I ==
Orizaba—named after the town of Orizaba, Veracruz, Mexico—was laid down for the Ward Line by William Cramp & Sons Ship and Engine Building Company of Philadelphia and launched in February 1917. In mid-1917 the United States Shipping Board (USSB) commandeered and received title to all private shipbuilding projects in progress, including the still-incomplete Orizaba and her sister ship Siboney. Plans for both ships were modified for troop-carrying duties. Upon Orizaba's completion, the USSB delivered her to the US Navy for transport duty on 11 April 1918, and she was commissioned as USS Orizaba (ID-1536) on 27 May.

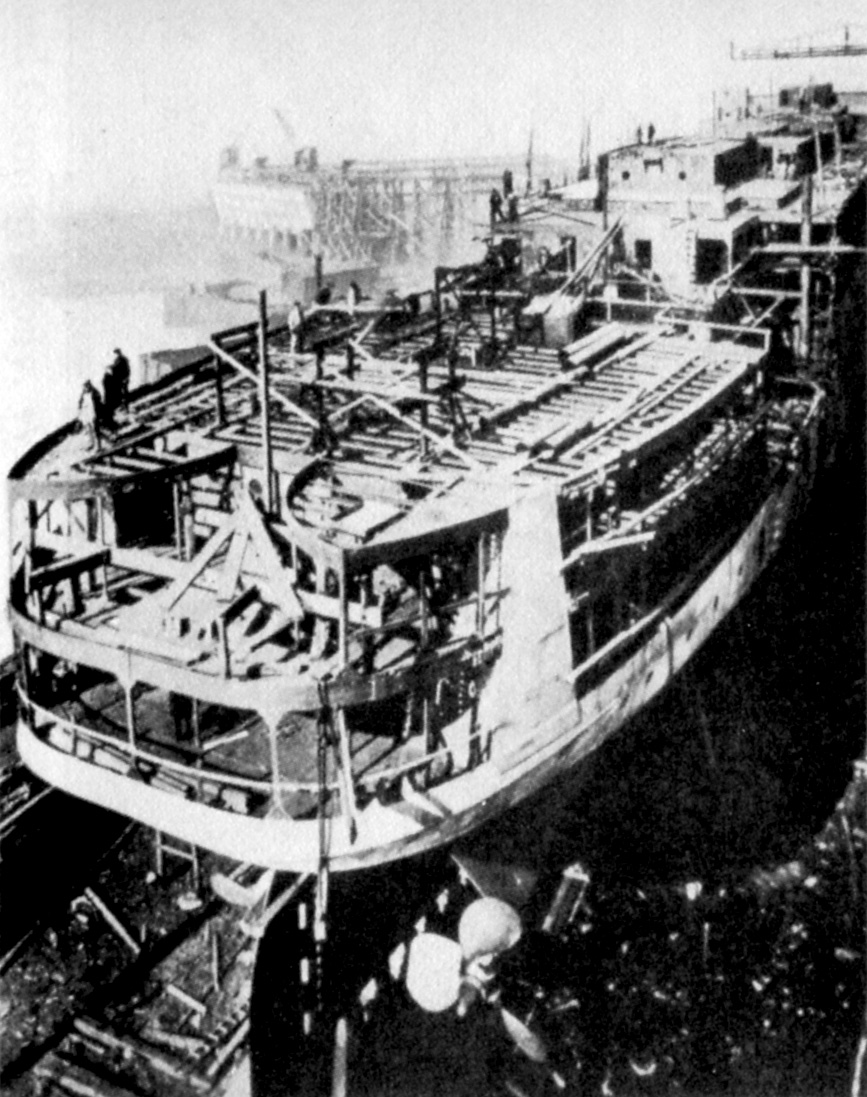
Orizaba under construction at William Cramp & Sons in Philadelphia, c. 1917

Assigned to the Atlantic Transport Service, Orizaba carried over 15,000 troops in six convoy trips to France before the end of World War I. In one such voyage, Orizaba's executive officer, ordnance expert William Price Williamson, worked closely with Commander Richard Drace White—Orizaba's commanding officer, himself an ordnance expert—to develop a workable depth charge launcher which would provide the transport with a measure of protection from enemy submarines. Williamson set about modifying a Lyle gun into a depth charge launcher, and successfully tested it on 16 August 1918. While attempting another test with an increased propellant charge the following day, a defective fuse exploded the depth charge prematurely, killing Williamson and three other sailors. White, four other officers, and twenty-two enlisted men were also wounded in the blast.

Four days later on 21 August at 08:30, Orizaba, traveling with Siboney, spotted a submarine in the act of submerging. Orizaba attempted to ram the sub and dropped depth charges, but there was no indication that the attack was successful.

In December 1918, she was temporarily assigned to assist the French government in repatriating French, Belgian, and Italian prisoners of war. Detached from that duty on 10 January 1919, she joined the Cruiser and Transport Force at Brest, and in nine voyages returned over 31,700 troops to the United States. After the completion of transport duty service in the summer of 1919, she was decommissioned on 4 September and subsequently turned over to the Army for further transport service as USAT Orizaba. The boat served in that capacity until returned to the Ward Line in 1920.

According to the Statistical Department of the US Navy, Orizaba had the second-shortest average in-port turnaround time out of 37 US Navy transports used in World War I. The ship completed 15 round trips with an average turn-around time of just over 30 days per trip, while the overall Navy average was 39.8 days.

== Post-war civilian service ==
After Orizaba and Siboney were reacquired by the Ward Line, Orizaba was registered as a merchant vessel. Her port of registry was New York, and United States Official Number 216294 and Code Letters LJKM were allocated to her. Orizaba and Siboney were placed in transatlantic service on New York–Cuba–Spain routes in 1920, with Orizaba calling at Corunna, Santander, and Bilbao in Spain. The two ships accommodated 306 first-class, 60 second-class, and 64 third-class passengers, with each ship making several trips on the route, but a lack of passengers (along with the grounding of Siboney at Vigo in September 1920) led to the abandonment of the route.

By October 1921, Orizaba was placed in New York–Cuba–Mexico service, where business thrived, in part because of Prohibition in the United States. Ward Line cruises to Havana were one of the quickest and least expensive ways to what one author called "alcohol-enriched vacations". Three years later, the ship underwent a major refit that, among other things, lengthened her funnels. A typical voyage at this time sailed from New York and called at Nassau, Havana, Progreso, Veracruz and Tampico.

By the early 1930s, Orizaba's typical route had remained virtually the same, though Nassau and Tampico were dropped as ports of call. It was in this period that American poet Hart Crane leapt to his death from Orizaba. At around noon on 27 April 1932, while the ship was headed to New York—some 275 miles (443 km) north of Havana and 10 miles (16 km) off the Florida coast—Crane, clad in pajamas and overcoat, climbed the rail at the stern of the ship and plunged into the ocean. The captain of Orizaba immediately stopped the ship and launched four lifeboats that searched in vain for two hours, but no trace of the poet was ever found. Before he jumped, Crane had been drinking and, the night before, had been the victim of violence after an unwanted pick-up attempt of a crewman ended with a severe beating.

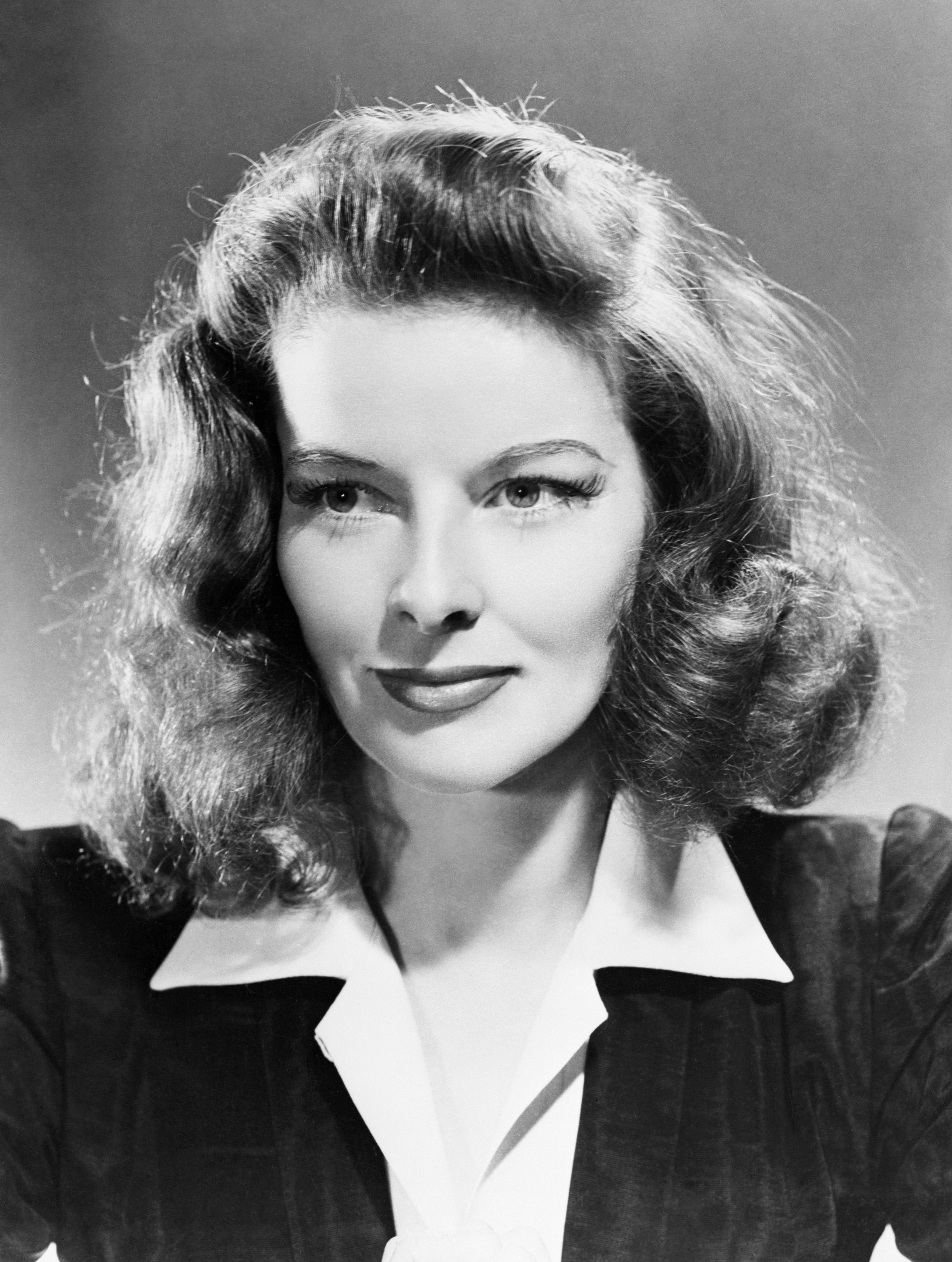
Katharine Hepburn, seen here in 1941, sailed on Orizaba to get a Mexican divorce in 1934.

In 1934, Orizaba was allocated the Code Letters WECX. In April 1934, American actress Katharine Hepburn sailed from New York on Orizaba, eventually ending up in Mérida, Yucatán. After her arrival there on 22 April, she filed for divorce from businessman Ludlow ("Luddy") Ogden Smith, whom she had married in December 1928. After the divorce was finalized she and her travel companion, Laura Harding, planned to spend a week in Havana and return to New York on the Ward Line ship Morro Castle. Other notable passengers on Orizaba in the 1930s included Ecuadorean diplomat Gonzalo Zaldumbide and Cuban president Fulgencio Batista. Zaldumbide, the Ecuadorean Minister to the United States, sailed to Mexico for his new posting as Minister to Mexico in August 1932. In February 1939, Orizaba carried Cuban leader Fulgencio Batista back to Havana after a two-week goodwill visit to Mexico.

Beginning in the mid-1930s, Orizaba often carried gold and silver bars from Veracruz to New York for the Federal Reserve Bank of New York, Chase National Bank, or for later transshipment to London. In October 1933 three short tons (2.7 tonnes) of gold bars and coins were shipped on Orizaba for eventual delivery to London, prompting some to believe that gold was being smuggled into Mexico to take advantage of its policy of not charging duties on gold. In July 1934 Orizaba brought in 16 cases of Mexican gold, and in January 1935, 20 cases; in both instances, for delivery to Chase National Bank. Twice in 1935, the Ward liner delivered over 1,000 bars of silver for the Federal Reserve Bank, bringing 1,390 bars in March, and 1,933 bars in July. Mexico was not the only place from which Orizaba delivered precious metals. In March 1934, she delivered 12 cases of gold—consisting of 84 bars, and worth $1,624,000—from Havana for Chase.

In mid-1939, Orizaba was chartered to United States Lines as one of five ships added to increase what was perceived as a slow rate of return of US citizens fleeing war-torn Europe. In September, the ship was diverted to Galway to pick up American survivors of SS Athenia, torpedoed by U-30 on 3 September; Orizaba returned with 240 of the survivors later that month. After completing evacuation service, the ship was laid up in New York in the summer of 1940, and subsequently purchased by the Maritime Commission on behalf of the Army on 27 February 1941.

== Pre World War II ==
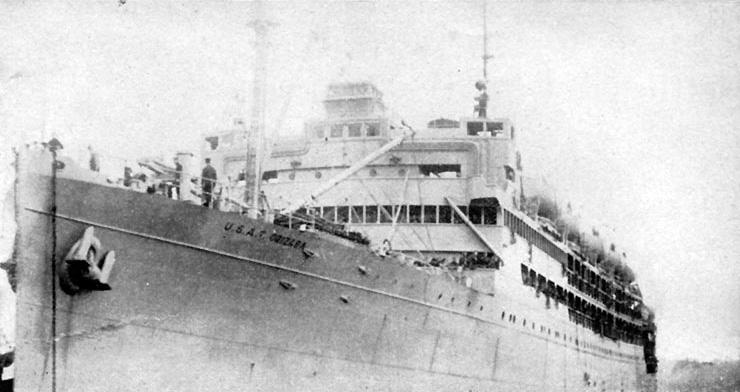
USAT Orizaba in port, 1941

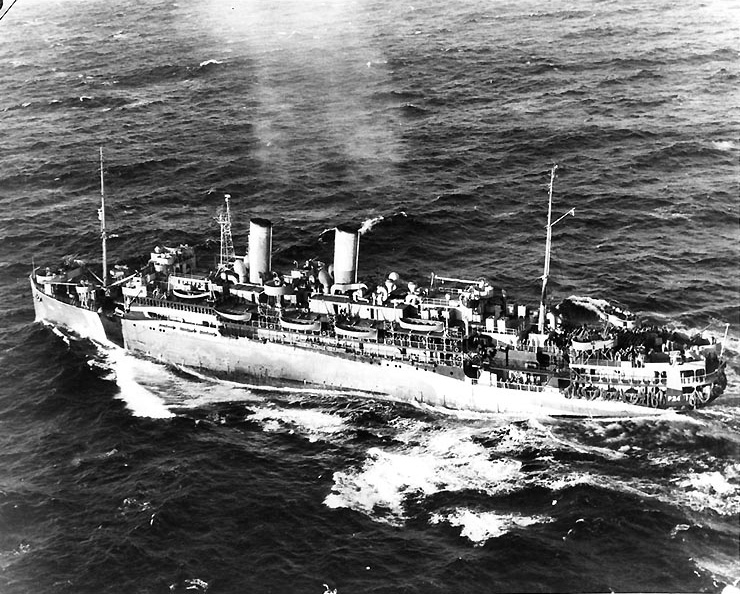
USS Orizaba (AP-24) underway at sea painted in Camouflage Measure 32, Design 11F, c. 1944

After her reacquisition by the War Department, Orizaba completed one round trip to the Panama Canal Zone. On her return she put in for a refit by the Bethlehem Steel Company at New York. After she was transferred to the Navy on 4 June 1941, she was commissioned as Orizaba (AP-24) on 15 June 1941.

=== Preamble to Convoy WS-12X ===
The Atlantic Conference was held on 9 August 1941 in Placentia Bay, Newfoundland, between Prime Minister Winston Churchill and President Roosevelt. Besides the "official" agenda, Churchill hoped to obtain considerable assistance from the US, but the American President had his political hands tied. On 1 September 1941, Roosevelt received an urgent and most secret message asking for US Navy troopships manned by Navy crews and escorted by U.S.N. fighting ships to carry British troops for the purpose of reinforcing the Middle East. On 4 September the US destroyer, USS Greer (DD-145), came under an unsuccessful U-boat attack. Roosevelt gave authority to the US Navy to "shoot to kill". On 5 September the President assured the British leader that six vessels would be provided to carry twenty thousand troops and would be escorted by the American Navy.

The chief of Naval Operations ordered troop ships divisions seventeen and nineteen, on 26 September 1941, to prepare their vessels for approximately six months at sea. These transports were to load to capacity with food, ammunition medical supplies, fuel and water and were to arrive at Halifax, NS on or about 6 November and after the arrival of a British convoy from the UK were to load twenty thousand troops. The Prime Minister mentioned in his letter that it would be for the President to say what would be required in replacement if any of these ships were to be sunk by enemy action. Agreements were worked out for the troops to be carried as supernumeraries and rations to be paid out of Lend Lease Funds and officer laundry bills were to be paid in cash. All replenishments of provisions, general stores, fuel and water would be provided by the UK. Fuel and water would be charged for the escorts to the UK in Trinidad and Cape Town only. The troops would conform to US Navy and ships regulation. Intoxicating liquors were prohibited. It was further agreed that the troops were to rig and man their own anti-aircraft guns to augment the ships batteries.

==== Convoy William Sail WS-12X ====
In early November, the troopship proceeded to Halifax, Nova Scotia, to take on board British troops.

Wakefield (AP-21), with 6,000 men embarked, and five other transports Mount Vernon (AP-22), West Point (AP-23), Orizaba (AP-24), Leonard Wood (AP-25) and Joseph T. Dickman (AP-26) got underway as Convoy WS12-X on 10 November 1941. Escorted by a strong screen – which, as far as Trinidad, included Ranger (CV-4) – the convoy was destined for Basra, Iraq.

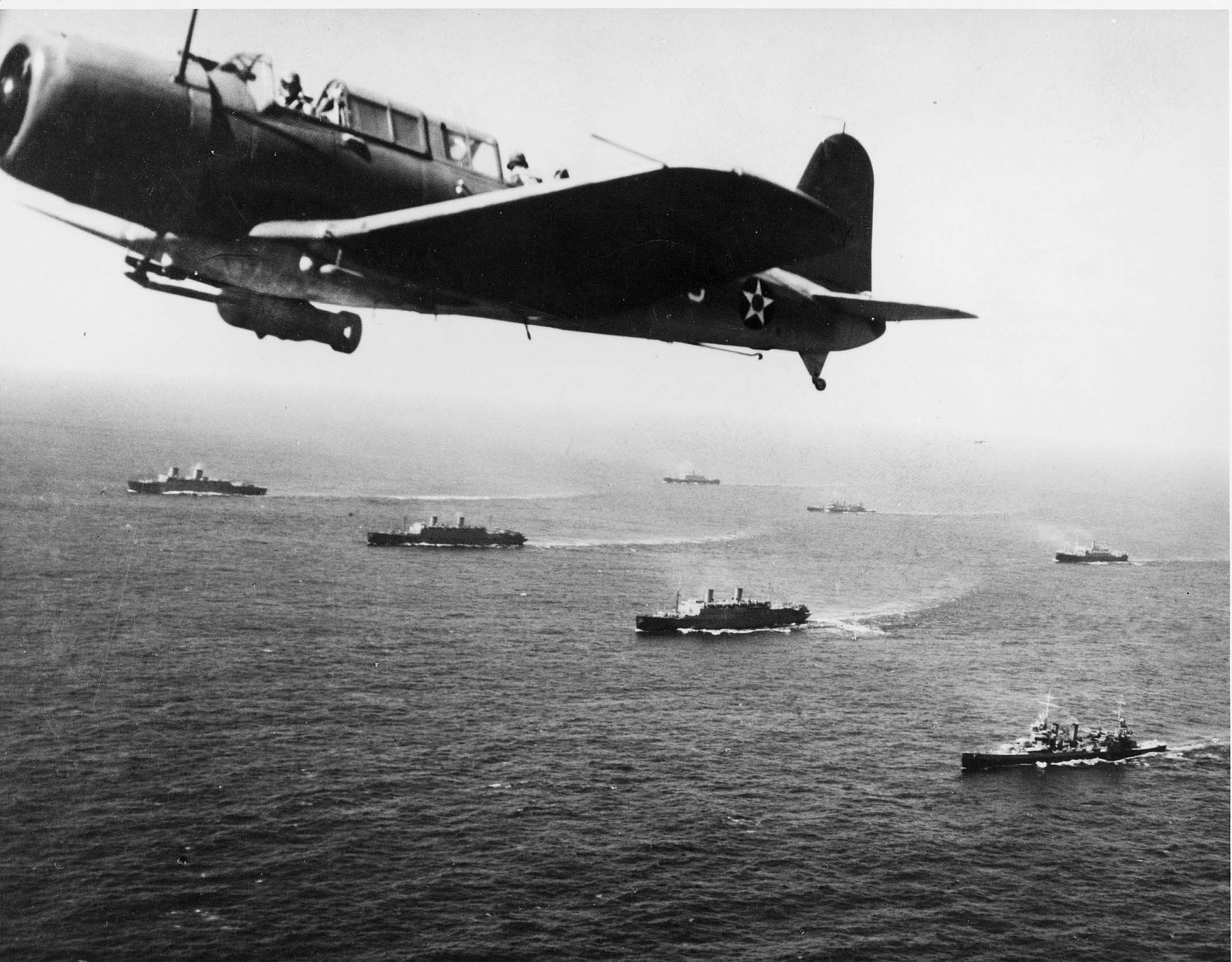
Convoy WS-12 en route to Cape Town, 1941

On 17 November 1941, the convoy reaches Trinidad. All ships were replenished, and the convoy departs Trinidad on 19 November 1941.

On 7 December at 2000, the convoy receives a radio communication of the Japanese attack on Pearl Harbor.

== World War II service ==
=== Convoy WS12-X (continued) ===
On 9 December, convoy WS12-X arrived in Cape Town, South Africa.

At about 0800 on 13 December 1941, the troopships departed Cape Town headed for Bombay.

At 650 on 21 December 1941, the USS Mount Vernon (AP-22) and USS Orizaba detached from the convoy headed for Bombay, and are bound for Mombasa. The remainder of the convoy continued to Bombay under the escort of DORSETSHIRE, arriving on 27 December 1941.

=== 1942–1945 ===
Following several months of coastal operations, Orizaba, now armed with two 5-inch (130 mm) guns and four 3-inch (76 mm) guns, departed New York in April 1942 on the first transatlantic run of her Second World War. Sailing via Iceland, she steamed to England, Cape Town, Recife, and Norfolk, Virginia, from which she got underway for Bermuda and Puerto Rico. Returning to Norfolk in January 1943, she plied the eastern seaboard for a month, then took up transatlantic duties again. Until July she traversed the ocean to Oran, Algeria, carrying troops over and prisoners of war back to New York.

On 5 July she left Oran in Task Force (TF) 81. The next day, she rendezvoused with TF 85 and on 9 July stood off Gela, Sicily, disembarking troops into landing craft. On 11 July, she sustained slight damage in an enemy air attack and retired to Algeria the next day with casualties and prisoners on board. She returned to Sicily at the end of the month to discharge troops and cargo at Palermo and then, on the night of 1 August, weighed anchor and stood out for home.

Arriving at New York on 22 August 1943, she underwent an overhaul, then took on runs to Brazil and the Caribbean. At the end of the year she left the east coast, passed through the Panama Canal, and sailed on to the southwestern Pacific. After calls at Samoa, Nouméa, Brisbane, and Milne Bay, she returned to the west coast in March 1944, only to leave again for another central Pacific run. Back at San Francisco in June, she underwent repairs; completed a run to the Marshalls and Marianas; and then sailed north to the Aleutians. Completing her northern run at Seattle, Washington, on 1 December, she carried men and supplies to Hawaii, then returned to San Francisco, later sailing to New Guinea, the Philippines, and Ulithi to add men and materiel to forces gathering for the Battle of Okinawa.

From Ulithi, Orizaba sailed east, passed through the Panama Canal again, and, as the battle for Okinawa raged, arrived at Tampa, Florida. Decommissioned on 23 April, she underwent an overhaul and on 16 July 1945 she was transferred to Brazil under the terms of Lend-Lease. The ship was permanently transferred to Brazil in June 1953 and struck from the US Naval Vessel Register on 20 July of that same year. Orizaba received one battle star for her US Navy service in World War II.

== Brazilian Navy service ==
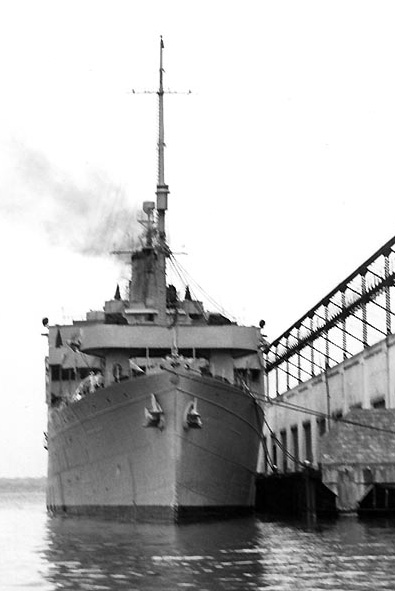
Duque de Caxias (U-11) in port, c. 1950s

Assuming control of the vessel at Tampa on 16 July 1945, the Brazilian Navy renamed the veteran transport Duque de Caxias (U-11), the second ship of that navy named in honor of Luís Alves de Lima e Silva, Duke of Caxias, the patron of the Brazilian Army.

Duque de Caxias headed to Naples and on 28 August 1945 left there with elements of the returning Brazilian Expeditionary Force. The ship arrived at Rio de Janeiro for the first time on 17 September 1945. The ship then loaded American military stores from US bases in Brazil and sailed for New York, arriving on 10 November 1945, with plans to repatriate wounded Brazilian soldiers who had been recuperating in the US.

On 31 July 1947, a day after sailing from Rio de Janeiro for Europe, oil spilled on the ship's boilers, causing an engine-room fire that quickly spread through the first class cabins and killed 27. The ship was towed from its position off Cabo Frio into Rio de Janeiro on 1 August 1947. The ship had been carrying 1,060 passengers bound for Lisbon, Naples, and Marseille, along with 500 crew members, and had been scheduled to carry Italian refugees on its return voyage.

In 1953, Duque de Caxias was converted into a training ship, and in August of that year began a European and Mediterranean training cruise, which included a 12-day visit to New York in March 1954 as part of its homeward leg. The ship visited the United States again in December 1955, with midshipmen aboard who were touring the United States Naval Academy and who were honored at a cocktail party by the Brazilian Ambassador, João Carlos Muniz, at the Brazilian Embassy in Washington, D.C. In October the following year, Duque de Caxias called at Philadelphia, and the new Brazilian Ambassador Ernani do Amaral Peixoto—also an Admiral in the Brazilian Navy—and his wife sponsored a tea dance in honor of Captain Antonio Andrade, other officers of the ship, and the midshipmen aboard the ship; Peixoto had traveled to Philadelphia to greet Andrade, a former naval attaché at the embassy. The ship was decommissioned 13 April 1959, and finally scrapped in 1963. It was the last surviving member of the older Ward Line to survive above water.

== See also ==
- List of historical ships of the Brazilian Navy
