= SS President Roosevelt (1921) =

1921 Harris-class attack transport

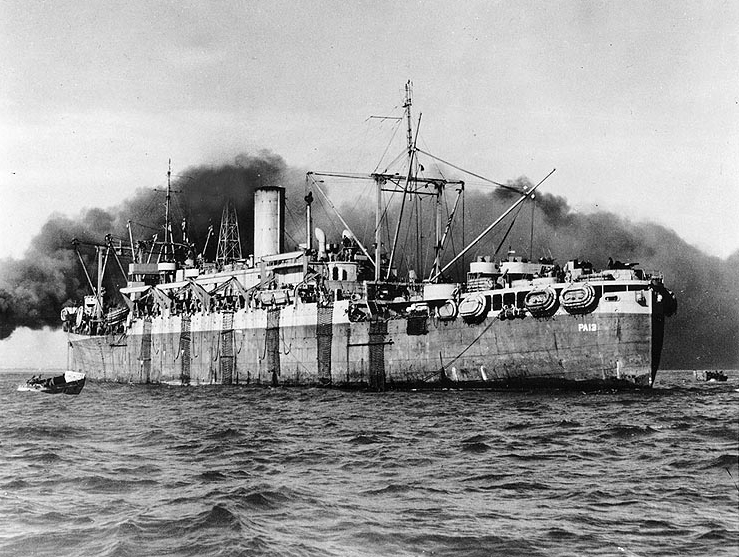
- USS Joseph T. Dickman (APA-13) in the process of disembarking troops, c. 1943

History

United States
- Name: USS Joseph T. Dickman (APA-13)
- Namesake: US Army General Joseph T. Dickman
- Builder: New York Shipbuilding
- Launched: 6 July 1921
- Christened: Peninsula State
- Completed: January 1922
- Acquired: (by the Navy) 27 May 1941
- Commissioned: (As AP-26) 10 June 1941
- Decommissioned: 7 March 1946
- Renamed: President Pierce, President Roosevelt, USS Joseph T. Dickman
- Reclassified: AP-26 to APA-13, 1 February 1943
- Stricken: 12 April 1946
- Honours and awards: Six battle stars for World War II service
- Fate: Sold for scrap, 9 January 1948

General characteristics
- Class & type: Harris-class attack transport
- Displacement: 13,529 tons (lt), 21,900 t.(fl)
- Length: 535 ft 2 in
- Beam: 72 ft 4 in
- Draft: 31 ft 3 in
- Propulsion: 2 x Bethlehem Steel Curtis type turbines, 8 x Yarrow header-type boilers, 2 propellers, designed shaft horsepower 10,000.
- Speed: 17 knots
- Capacity: Troops: 95 Officers, 1,961 Enlisted; Cargo: 170,000 cu ft, 2,600 tons
- Complement: Officers 58, Enlisted 635
- Armament: 4 x 3"/50 caliber dual-purpose gun mounts, 2 x twin 40mm gun mounts, 18 x single 20mm gun mounts.

SS President Roosevelt was an ocean liner in service in the 1920s and 1930s. Originally built as a Harris-class attack transport towards the end of World War I, she entered commercial service after her completion. Having been built as Peninsula State, she was soon renamed President Pierce and then President Roosevelt. Requisitioned for service as a troopship with the US Navy during World War II, she was renamed USS Joseph T. Dickman (APA-13) and served in the Atlantic and Pacific theaters, being scrapped postwar in 1948.

== History ==
=== Early career ===
Joseph T. Dickman was built as Peninsula State for the United States Shipping Board by the New York Shipbuilding Corporation of Camden, New Jersey, in 1921 and 1922. She began transatlantic service for United States Lines in 1922, and soon afterward in May was renamed President Pierce. In August 1922 the ship was renamed President Roosevelt, a name she carried during her many years of passenger service.

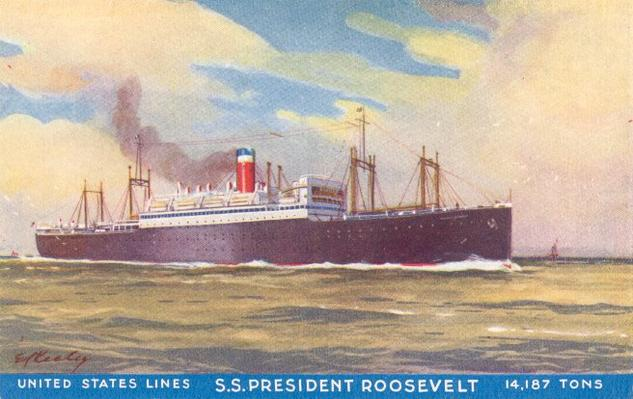
SS President Roosevelt as seen on a contemporary postcard

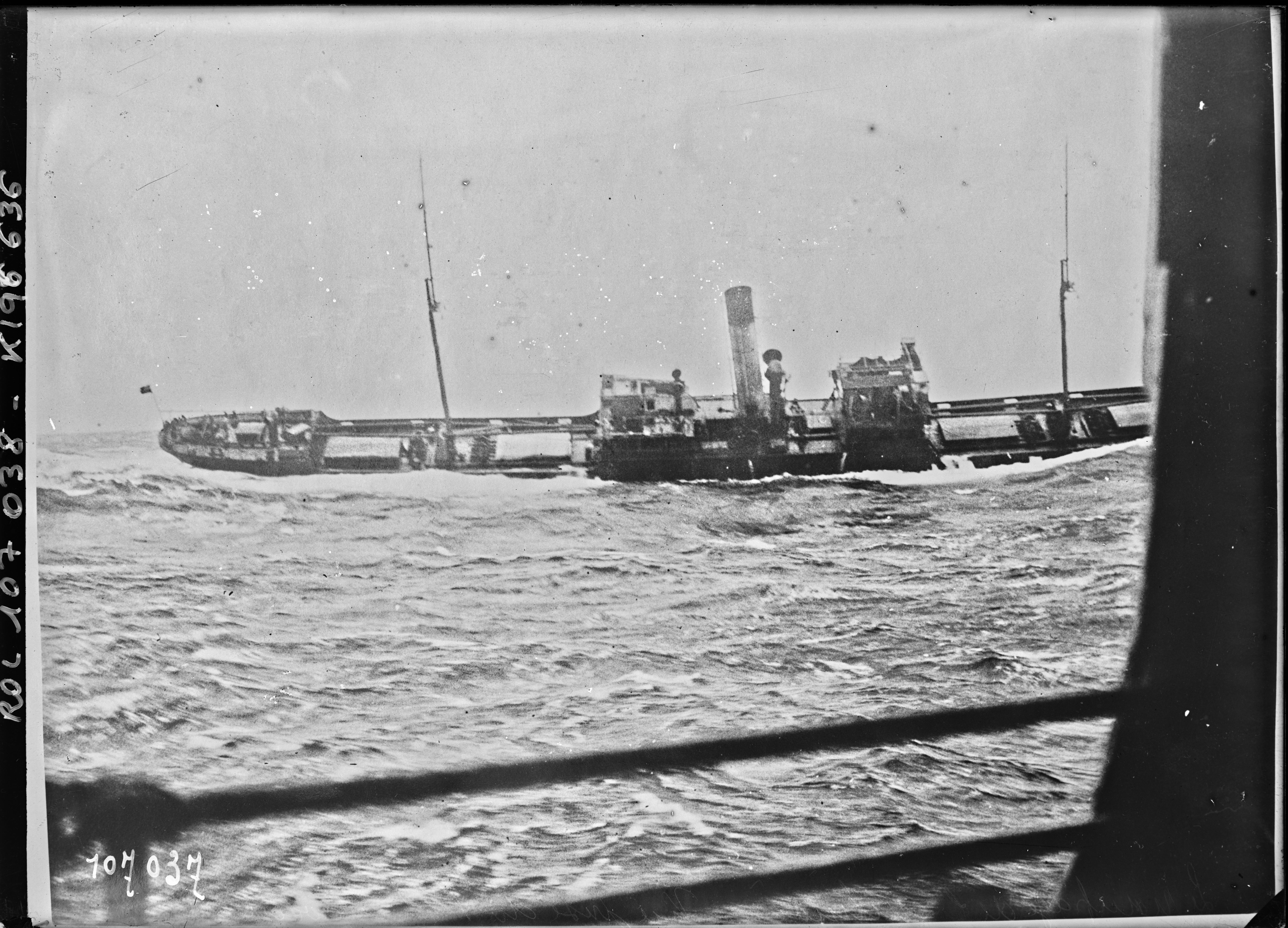
Antinoe taken from President Roosevelt during the rescue

In January 1926, President Roosevelt was involved in the rescue of the crew of the British cargo ship SS Antinoe that foundered in the Atlantic Ocean. George Fried, the Roosevelt's captain, was given a ticker-tape parade in Manhattan in honor of his heroism.

In the summer of 1928, the American Olympic Team sailed on President Roosevelt to compete in the Ninth Olympiad in Amsterdam, the Netherlands.

On 30 January 1932, the Italian ocean liner Roma rammed President Roosevelt at New York, inflicting severe damage on President Roosevelt.

In 1935, she transported U.S. delegation athletes to the 1935 Maccabiah Games in Palestine.

In 1939 agreement was reached with the American Electric Launch Company (Elco) to purchase a British Power Boat 70-footer (later named USS PT-9), as a template for American production under licence. PT-9 was taken by President Roosevelt to Elco's works at New London, Connecticut. On 3 October 1939 Scott-Paine met President Franklin D. Roosevelt and senior Elco representatives at the White House to authorize the creation of a new naval arm, the patrol torpedo boat ("PT boat") squadrons. Production of PT boats started at a new Elco factory at Bayonne, New Jersey, in January 1940.

== Pre-World War II service ==
After the Battle of France began, the State Department sent the President Roosevelt to Galway, Ireland in late May 1940 to pick up Americans who wanted to come home from the British Isles. Taken over by the War Department in October 1940, it was renamed Joseph T. Dickman and converted to a troopship by Atlantic Basin Iron Works of Brooklyn. The ship was subsequently transferred to the Navy 27 May 1941 and further converted to Navy use at New York Navy Yard. She commissioned at the Navy Yard (as AP-26) on 10 June 1941.

The new transport got underway 26 June 1941 for Hampton Roads, and until August she took part in amphibious training exercises off Onslow Beach, N.C. After these important landings, which helped develop the tactics and equipment to be used later with such great success, Joseph T. Dickman returned to New York 14 August. She then moved to Boston for further conversion, remaining there until 1 October.

=== Preamble to Convoy WS-12X (the US had not yet declared war) ===
The Atlantic Conference was held on 9 August 1941 in Placentia Bay, Newfoundland, between Prime Minister Winston Churchill and President Roosevelt. Besides the "official" agenda, Churchill hoped to obtain considerable assistance from the US, but the American President had his political hands tied. On 1 September 1941, Roosevelt received an urgent and most secret message asking for US Navy troopships manned by Navy crews and escorted by U.S.N. fighting ships to carry British troops for the purpose of reinforcing the Middle East. On 4 September the US destroyer, USS Greer (DD-145), came under an unsuccessful U-boat attack. Roosevelt gave authority to the US Navy to "shoot to kill". On 5 September the President assured the British leader that six vessels would be provided to carry twenty thousand troops and would be escorted by the American Navy.

The chief of Naval Operations ordered troop ships divisions seventeen and nineteen, on 26 September 1941, to prepare their vessels for approximately six months at sea. These transports were to load to capacity with food, ammunition medical supplies, fuel and water and were to arrive at Halifax, NS on or about 6 November and after the arrival of a British convoy from the UK were to load twenty thousand troops. The Prime Minister mentioned in his letter that it would be for the President to say what would be required in replacement if any of these ships were to be sunk by enemy action. Agreements were worked out for the troops to be carried as supernumeraries and rations to be paid out of Lend Lease Funds and officer laundry bills were to be paid in cash. All replenishments of provisions, general stores, fuel and water would be provided by the UK. Fuel and water would be charged for the escorts to the UK in Trinidad and Cape Town only. The troops would conform to US Navy and ships regulation. Intoxicating liquors were prohibited. It was further agreed that the troops were to rig and man their own anti-aircraft guns to augment the ships batteries.

So, convoy WS-12X is most extraordinary. It sailed 30 days before the Japanese attack on Pearl Harbor on 7 December 1941 and the German declaration of war on the US on 11 December 1941. These were six American transports and an American escort carrying British soldiers.

==== Convoy William Sail WS-12X ====
Stores were loaded at Norfolk, Virginia in October and in early November, the troopship proceeded to Halifax, Nova Scotia, to take on board British troops.

Wakekfield (AP-21), with 6,000 men embarked, and five other transports Mount Vernon (AP-22), West Point (AP-23), Orizaba (AP-24), Leonard Wood (AP-25) and Joseph T. Dickman (AP-26) got underway as Convoy WS12-X on 10 November 1941. Escorted by a strong screen – which, as far as Trinidad, included Ranger (CV-4) – the convoy was destined for Basra, Iraq.

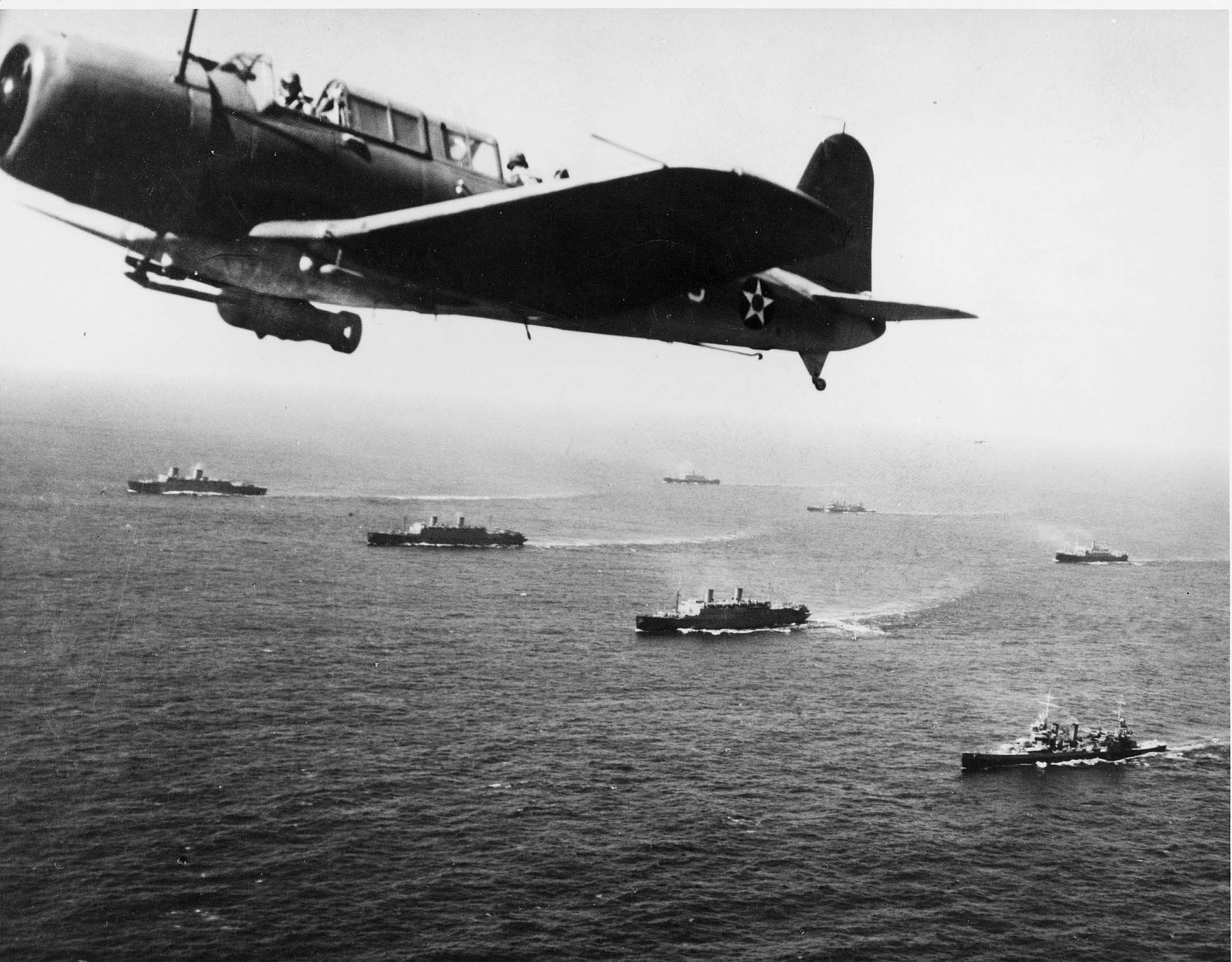
Convoy WS-12 en route to Cape Town, 1941

On 17 November 1941, the convoy reaches Trinidad. All ships were replenished, and the convoy departs Trinidad on 19 November 1941.

On 7 December at 2000, the convoy receives a radio communication of the Japanese attack on Pearl Harbor.

== World War II Service ==
=== Convoy WS12-X (continued) ===
On 9 December 1941, convoy WS12-X arrived in Cape Town, South Africa.

At about 0800 on 13 December 1941, the troopships departed Cape Town headed for Bombay.

At 650 on 21 December 1941, the USS Mount Vernon (AP-22) and USS Orizaba detached from the convoy headed for Bombay, and are bound for Mombasa. The remainder of the convoy continued to Bombay under the escort of DORSETSHIRE, arriving on 27 December 1941.

Joseph T. Dickman arrived Bombay 27 December 1941 and debarked troops.

=== 1942 ===
Departing 10 January, she retraced her steps to New York, arriving 28 February 1942 for the installation of new boats and lowering equipment. After leaving the yard in April the ship underwent tests in Hampton Roads before departing 11 May for transport duties in the Caribbean. She stopped at San Juan and Bermuda to debark troops before returning to Norfolk 27 May 1942.

Joseph T. Dickman carried further reinforcements to Caribbean bases in June, and spent July on amphibious exercises in Chesapeake Bay. Training and additional conversion to increase her boat capacity continued into October, when the ship prepared for Operation Torch, the invasion of North Africa. As part of the Western Naval Task Force, Joseph T. Dickman got underway from Norfolk 24 October to take part in the first amphibious invasion ever launched across an entire ocean. Arriving in the transport area of Fedhala early 8 November, she began the debarkation. She remained off shore until German submarine attacks forced her seaward 12 November.

As the successful invasion was consolidated, however, Joseph T. Dickman entered Casablanca harbor 15 November and completed unloading. Two days later she was underway for Norfolk, arriving 30 November 1942.

=== 1943 ===
After embarking troops and taking on cargo, Joseph T. Dickman departed 27 December 1942 for the Pacific via the Panama Canal. She stopped at Nouméa and Brisbane before sailing for Norfolk again, where she arrived 10 March 1943. During this voyage, on 1 February 1943, the ship was reclassified APA-13.

The veteran troopship departed 10 May 1943 for North Africa, in preparation for the invasion of Sicily. She arrived Mers el Kebir 23 May and, after landing rehearsals, got underway with the invasion fleet from Algiers 6 July. As a part of Rear Admiral Hall's Gela landing force, she arrived off the beaches 10 July and began the long process of debarkation. Next day she suffered minor damage fighting off German bombing attacks, damaging at least three of the attackers with her accurate gunfire. With the invasion quickly successful, the ship was underway for Algiers 12 July for more exercises.

The next major amphibious operation in the campaign to regain Italy was slated for Salerno; and, after training, Joseph T. Dickman arrived off the beaches with Hall's Southern Attack Force 9 September. Rockets from an LCS attached to the ship helped clear the way for the first wave of boats, and, after receiving near misses from shore batteries, the transport debarked her troops and returned to Mers el Kebir.

As the battle to consolidate the beachhead began, Joseph T. Dickman returned with reinforcements to Salerno 6 October. She made two other follow-up voyages from Africa to Italy, the final one with over 1,000 French troops. The ship sailed 30 November 1943 for Norfolk by way of Scotland.

=== 1944 ===
Upon her arrival 1 January 1944, the ship underwent battle repairs; and, after embarking troops, sailed 11 February 1944 for Glasgow. During the next few months the ship was engaged in intensive training for the giant Normandy invasion, scheduled for June.

Sailing from England 5 June, she arrived off Utah Beach early the next day and landed her troops without a mishap. On the afternoon of D-Day, she steamed to Portland with casualties, later making a shuttle voyage to the beaches 14 June as troops moved inland to liberate France. Upon arriving Mers el Kebir 10 July 1944, Joseph T. Dickman began preparations for still another landing, this time in southern France.

After exacting training operations, she sailed from Sicily 13 August 1944, arriving off the Delta Force beaches next day to debark her troops. After smooth and skillful unloading, she steamed to Naples, arriving 17 August. In the weeks that followed, Joseph T. Dickman made five follow-up voyages to southern France from Mediterranean staging points as the Allies pressed northward. The veteran ship sailed from Mers el Kebir 25 October for the United States, arriving Boston 8 November.

Joseph T. Dickman, after taking part in every major amphibious operation in the European-African theater, now turned her attention to the Pacific.

=== Pacific War ===
==== 1945 ====
She sailed 24 January 1945 with troops for Guadalcanal, arriving via Espiritu Santo 12 February. There she began training operations for the invasion of Okinawa. From 21 to 27 March the transports made final preparations at Ulithi, sailing the latter date for the last and greatest of the Pacific invasions. The troops stormed ashore 1 April, but the transport remained off the beaches helping to ward off air attacks while unloading cargo until 9 April. She then sailed to Saipan, and continued to Pearl Harbor, where she anchored 25 April 1945.

Joseph T. Dickman arrived at San Francisco with veterans 30 May. After two troop voyages to Pearl Harbor, the ship remained at the Navy Yard there for conversion to a casualty evacuation ship for the projected invasion of Japan. Emerging 10 August, she was en route to San Francisco when the fighting ended 14 August 1945.

Joseph T. Dickman then sailed for the Philippines 24 August; and, upon arrival in Manila 17 September, took on American and Allied soldiers who had been prisoners of the Japanese for transportation to the United States. Coincidentally, four British enlisted men came on board, who after 3½ years in a prison camp were returning to the United States on the same ship which had carried them from Halifax to Bombay in 1941.

The ship reached San Francisco 16 October. Assigned to Operation Magic Carpet, Joseph T. Dickman made a voyage to Pearl Harbor, returning to Seattle 2 December 1945.

== Post World War II ==
She moved south to San Francisco 13 January 1946. The ship steamed to Suisun Bay in March, decommissioned 7 March, and was returned to the Maritime Commission 22 January 1947, who transferred her to the National Defense Reserve Fleet, Suisun Bay, Benicia, California. She was sold on 9 January 1948 to the Kaiser Co. for scrapping.

== Awards ==
- American Defense Service Medal
- European-African-Middle Eastern Campaign Medal with four battle stars
- Asiatic-Pacific Campaign Medal with one battle star
- World War II Victory Medal
