= USS Mount Vernon (AP-22) =

- USS Mount Vernon (AP-22) In New York City 1941.

History

United States
- Name: USS Mount Vernon (AP-22)
- Namesake: Mount Vernon in Virginia
- Ordered: 24 May 1930
- Builder: New York Shipbuilding
- Laid down: 20 January 1931
- Launched: 20 August 1932
- Christened: SS Washington
- Acquired: (by the Navy) 16 June 1941
- Commissioned: 16 June 1941
- Decommissioned: 18 January 1946
- Renamed: USS Mount Vernon (AP-22)
- Stricken: 1959
- Fate: Scrapped 1965

General characteristics
- Tonnage: 24,289 gross register tons
- Displacement: 34,600 tons (fl)
- Length: 705 ft 3 in
- Beam: 86 ft
- Draft: 31 ft 6 in
- Propulsion: Parsons steam turbines, Babcock & Wilcox boilers, twin screw, 30,000 shaft horsepower
- Speed: 20.5 knots
- Troops: 6,031
- Complement: 766
- Armament: 4 × 5"/38 caliber guns; 4 × 3"/50 caliber guns; 8 × 0.5 in (12.7 mm) machine guns

USS Mount Vernon (AP-22) was a troop transport that served with the United States Navy during World War II. Prior to her military service, she was a luxury ocean liner named SS Washington.

Washington was launched in May 1933 by the New York Shipbuilding Company of Camden, New Jersey, and operated as a passenger liner from New York City to Plymouth, England, and Hamburg, Germany. Renamed Mount Vernon 6 June 1941, the liner was acquired by the Navy 16 June 1941 and commissioned at the Philadelphia Navy Yard the same day, Captain Donald B. Beary in command.

Converted for naval use by Philadelphia Navy Yard, Mount Vernon trained along the east coast while mounting tension in the Far East drew the United States toward participation in World War II.

== The Preamble to Convoy WS-12X (the USA has not declared war on Japan or Germany yet) ==
The Atlantic Conference was held on 9 August 1941 in Placentia Bay, Newfoundland, between Prime Minister Winston Churchill and President Roosevelt. Besides the "official" agenda, Churchill hoped to obtain considerable assistance from the US, but the American President had his political hands tied. On 1 September 1941, Roosevelt received an urgent and most secret message asking for US Navy troopships manned by Navy crews and escorted by U.S.N. fighting ships to carry British troops for the purpose of reinforcing the Middle East. On 4 September the US destroyer, USS Greer (DD-145), came under an unsuccessful U-boat attack. Roosevelt gave authority to the US Navy to "shoot to kill". On 5 September the President assured the British leader that six vessels would be provided to carry twenty thousand troops and would be escorted by the American Navy.

The chief of Naval Operations ordered troop ships divisions seventeen and nineteen, on 26 September 1941, to prepare their vessels for approximately six months at sea. These transports were to load to capacity with food, ammunition medical supplies, fuel and water and were to arrive at Halifax, NS on or about 6 November and after the arrival of a British convoy from the UK were to load twenty thousand troops. The Prime Minister mentioned in his letter that it would be for the President to say what would be required in replacement if any of these ships were to be sunk by enemy action. Agreements were worked out for the troops to be carried as supernumeraries and rations to be paid out of Lend Lease Funds and officer laundry bills were to be paid in cash. All replenishments of provisions, general stores, fuel and water would be provided by the UK. Fuel and water would be charged for the escorts to the UK in Trinidad and Cape Town only. The troops would conform to US Navy and ships regulation. Intoxicating liquors were prohibited. It was further agreed that the troops were to rig and man their own anti-aircraft guns to augment the ships batteries.

=== Convoy William Sail WS-12X ===
On 10 November 1941, Convoy WS12-X, departs Halifax, Nova Scotia. The convoy consists of Aircraft Carrier Ranger (CV-4) and troopships Mount Vernon (AP-22), Wakefield (AP-21), West Point (AP-23), Orizaba (AP-24), Leonard Wood (AP-25) and Joseph T. Dickman (AP-26) and is destined for Basra Iraq.

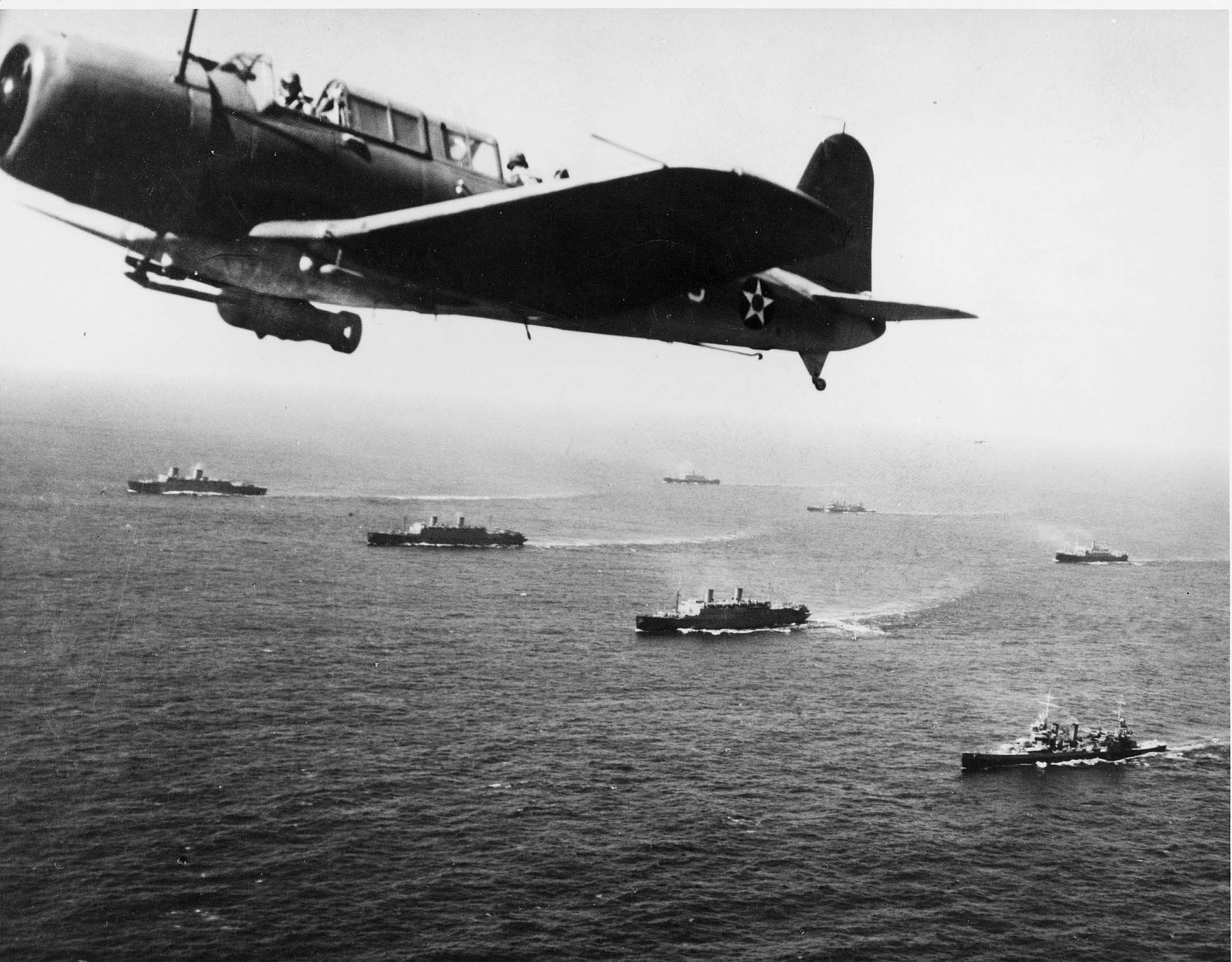
Convoy WS-12 en route to Cape Town, 1941

The USS Mount Vernon carries British Soldiers.

On 17 November 1941, the convoy reaches Trinidad. All ships are replenished, and the convoy departs Trinidad on 19 November 1941.

On 7 December at 2000, the convoy receives a radio communication of the Japanese attack on Pearl Harbor.

== US in WWII ==
On 9 December, the convoy arrives in Cape Town

At about 0800 on 13 December 1941, the troopships depart Cape Town headed for Bombay. At 650 on 21 December, the Mount Vernon and USS Orizaba detach from the convoy headed for Bombay, and are bound for Mombasa. The Mount Vernon and Orizaba arrive in Mombasa 25 December. At 0954 on 29 December the Mount Vernon departs Mombasa.

=== Convoy DM 1 ===
At 1000 on 30 December 1941, about 370 miles east of Mombasa, convoy WS12ZM (Malaya) detaches from convoys WS12ZA (Aden) and WS12ZB (Bombay) and with HMS Emerald, and USS Mt. Vernon form convoy DM.01 (Durban Malaya). DM.01 comprises the P&O's Narkunda, MV Aorangi, P&O's MV Sussex, and MS Abbekirk, USS Mt. Vernon and escort HMS Emerald.

Convoy DM.01 reaches ‘Port T’ – Addu Atoll in the Maldives – at 1000 on 4 January 1942. Water is taken aboard and mail sent ashore, but shore leave is not permitted. They leave at 0900 on the 5th.

11 January 1942, the convoy passes through the Sunda Strait

12 January 1942, the convoy passes through the Bangka Strait

13 January 1942, at 1315, the USS Mount Vernon moors at the Navy Yard, Singapore.

=== Duty 1942 ===
The USS ''Mount Vernon'' departs Singapore on 14 January for Aden, where she embarked Australian veterans of the Mediterranean Theatre for transportation to Ceylon and Fremantle. Mount Vernon was the lead ship in Operation Stepsister, the movement of Australian troops from North Africa and the Middle East to Southeast Asia, the Dutch East Indies and Australia in response to war in the Pacific, and was carrying 4,668 of those troops in waters south of the Dutch East Indies even as allied naval forces were withdrawing in the face of Japanese attacks. On 9 March Mount Vernon delivered the returning Australian Imperial Force (A.I.F.) troops to Adelaide.

In Australia she embarked civilian and military escapees from the Philippines, and naval survivors from ships sunk in the Battle of Makassar Strait. After calls in Adelaide, South Australia and Wellington, New Zealand, Mount Vernon sailed for San Francisco, arriving 31 March.

USS MOUNT VERNON - War Diary 1942-12

=== Duty 1943 ===
USS MOUNT VERNON - War Diary 1943-01

USS MOUNT VERNON - War Diary 1943-02

USS MOUNT VERNON - War Diary 1943-03

USS MOUNT VERNON - War Diary 1943-04

USS MOUNT VERNON - War Diary 1943-05

USS MOUNT VERNON - War Diary 1943-06

USS MOUNT VERNON - War Diary 1943-07

USS MOUNT VERNON - War Diary 1943-09

USS MOUNT VERNON - War Diary 1943-10

USS MOUNT VERNON - War Diary 1943–12 to 1944-01

For the next two years, Mount Vernon plied from San Francisco to ports in Australia, New Zealand, New Caledonia, and Hawaii, carrying the soldiers, marines, and sailors who would build the bases, then fight from them, bringing the ultimate victory over Japan.

=== Duty 1944 ===
USS MOUNT VERNON - War Diary 1943–12 to 1944-01

USS MOUNT VERNON - War Diary 1944-02

USS MOUNT VERNON - War Diary 1944-03

USS MOUNT VERNON - War Diary 1944-05

USS MOUNT VERNON - War Diary 1944-07

USS MOUNT VERNON - War Diary 1944-09

USS MOUNT VERNON - War Diary 1944-12

Her last such voyage began from Los Angeles on 26 February 1944. Steaming via Melbourne, she proceeded to Bombay, India, to debark Army personnel. She returned to Melbourne, and sailed for Boston by way of the Panama Canal, arriving 22 May.

On 4 June 1944, Mount Vernon began a series of voyages to United Kingdom ports and the Mediterranean, carrying men for the massive buildup on the European continent which would bring Germany to her knees. Her crossings continued after the war, as she carried occupation troops over and brought veterans home.

=== Duty 1945 ===
USS MOUNT VERNON - War Diary 1945-01

USS MOUNT VERNON - War Diary 1945-02

USS MOUNT VERNON - War Diary 1945-03

USS MOUNT VERNON - War Diary 1945-05

USS MOUNT VERNON - War Diary 1945-06

USS MOUNT VERNON - War Diary 1945-07

USS MOUNT VERNON - War Diary 1945-08

USS MOUNT VERNON - War Diary 1945-09

=== Decommissioning ===
Returning from the last voyage 3 January 1946, Mount Vernon decommissioned 18 January 1946, was delivered to the Maritime Commission, and again named Washington. She was struck from the Naval Register in 1959 and sold for scrap in 1965.

=== Awards ===
- American Defense Service Medal with star
- European-African-Middle Eastern Campaign Medal
- Asiatic-Pacific Campaign Medal
- World War II Victory Medal
- National Defense Service Medal
