= SS Manhattan (1931) =

American Ocean Liner Built By United States Lines

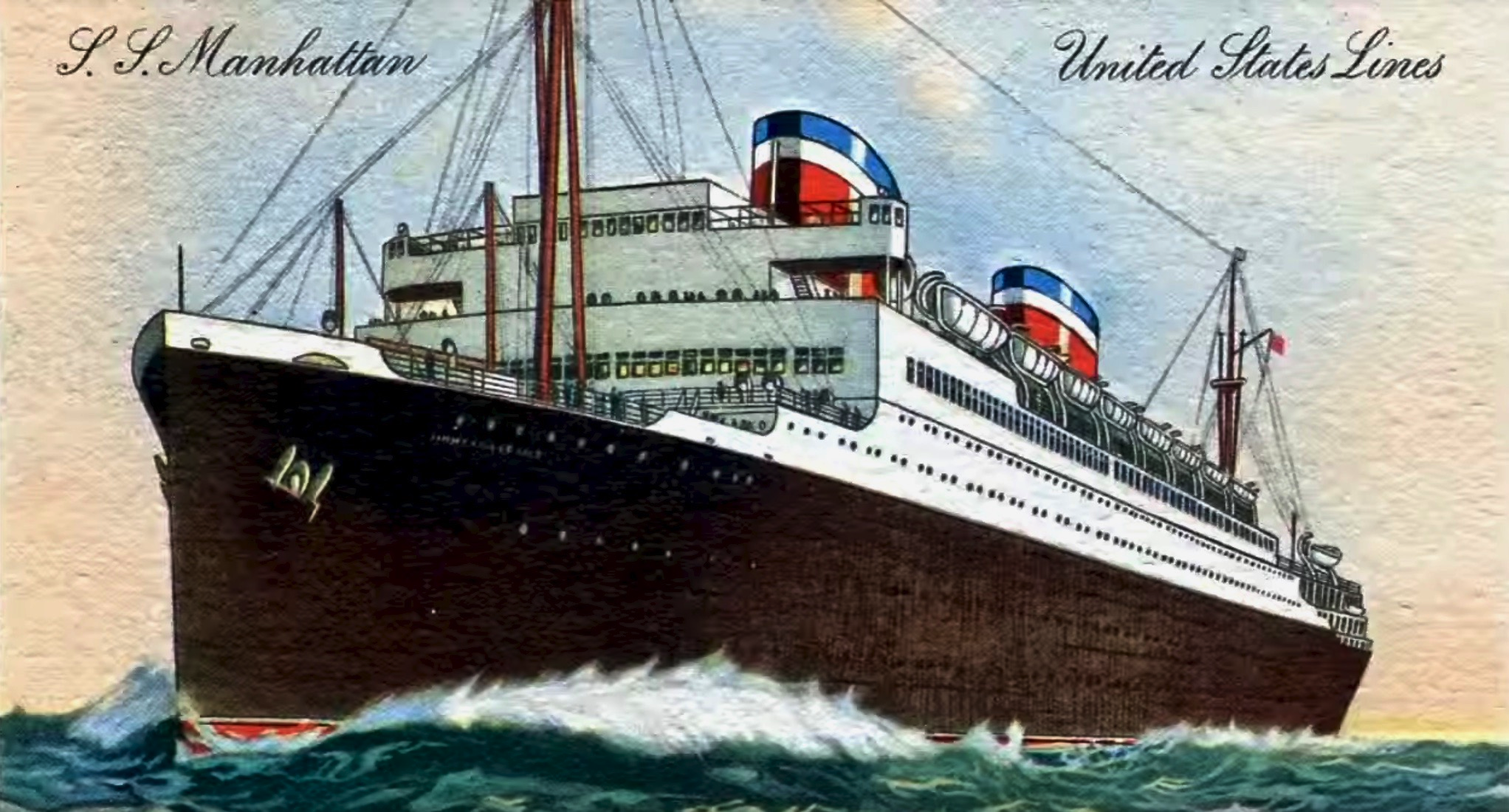
- A postcard of Manhattan

History

United States
- Operator: United States Lines
- Builder: New York Shipbuilding Corp, Camden
- Yard number: 405
- Laid down: 6 December 1930
- Launched: 5 December 1931
- Sponsored by: Mrs. Theodore Roosevelt, Sr.
- Acquired: 27 July 1932 (Delivered)
- Out of service: 1959
- Renamed: USS Wakefield (AP-21) (1941)
- Identification: official number 231779; code letters MJSG (until 1933); call sign WIEA (1934 onward)
- Fate: Sold to the United States Navy

United States
- Name: USS Wakefield
- Namesake: Wakefield, birthplace of George Washington
- Operator: United States Navy
- Acquired: (by the Navy) 6 June 1941
- Commissioned: 15 May 1940 – September 1942; 10 February 1944 – 16 June 1946
- Renamed: USS Wakefield
- Stricken: 1959
- Honors and awards: One battle star for World War II service
- Fate: Sold for scrap, 1965

General characteristics
- Tonnage: 24,289 GRT, 13,924 NRT
- Length: 705 ft (214.9 m) o/a; 666 ft (203.0 m) p/p; 668.4 ft (203.7 m) registry; 685 ft (208.8 m) on water line
- Beam: 86 ft (26 m)
- Draft: 32 ft (9.8 m) light load
- Depth: 79 ft (24 m) to promenade deck
- Decks: 9
- Propulsion: steam turbines – twin screw
- Speed: 20 knots (37 km/h; 23 mph) standard
- Capacity: 1,300 passengers (passenger service)
- Troops: 6,000 troops
- Crew: 481
- Notes: sister ship: Washington. Never returned to United States Line After World War II

SS Manhattan was a 24,189 GRT ocean liner built for the United States Lines, named after the Manhattan borough of New York City. On 15 June 1941 Manhattan was commissioned as USS Wakefield (AP-21) and became the largest ship ever operated by the US Coast Guard. In 1942 the ship caught fire and afterwards was rebuilt as a troop ship. Post-war, the liner was moored in New York in May, before decommissioning in June 1946. She was laid up in reserve at Jones Point, New York. Manhattan never returned to commercial service; in 1965, the ship was sold for scrapping.

== Construction ==
When they were built, Manhattan and her sister ship SS Washington, also built by New York Shipbuilding Corporation, were the largest liners ever built in the United States, and Manhattan was the first large liner built in the US since 1905. Manhattan and Washington were two of the few passenger liners built by New York Shipbuilding, which had previously built a large number of cargo liners. United States Lines signed contracts in 1931 for the two ships at a cost of about $21 million (equivalent to $445 million in 2025) each. This was considered an extreme cost in the Depression, and a gamble.

The ship's keel was laid as New York Shipbuilding's hull 405 on 6 December 1930 with launch on 5 December 1931 and delivery to the owners on 27 July 1932. Former First Lady Edith Roosevelt christened the ship with speakers representing shipping lines joining interest into the new United States Lines. Those lines were International Mercantile Marine Company, Roosevelt Lines, and the Dollar Lines.

The ship was 705 ft (214.9 m) length overall, 666 ft (203.0 m) length between perpendiculars and 685 ft (208.8 m) on water line. Eleven water tight bulkheads created twelve water tight compartments. Manhattan had nine decks: sun, boat, promenade, and decks A through F. Her tonnages were 24,289 GRT and 13,924 NRT, her registered length was 668.4 ft (203.7 m), her US official number was 231779 and until 1933, her code letters were MJSG. In 1934 these were superseded by call sign WIEA. She carried a crew of 481.

Manhattan was designed to carry 1,239 passengers in 582 cabin, 461 tourist, and 196 third class rooms. The main cabin class public rooms, including a grand salon, library, palm court, verandah café, and open recreation or dance space aft, were on the promenade deck. Cabin class state rooms were forward on A deck with tourist class game space aft. B deck had tourist class public rooms. Cabin class entrance foyer, state rooms, and dining were forward on C deck with tourist class entrance foyer, state rooms, and dining aft. Third class lounge and an open promenade were aft of the tourist class spaces on C deck. D deck contained some cabin class state rooms, a swimming pool, and gymnasium, with tourist class state rooms aft. Crew quarters and a mess hall/station were on E deck with the third class dining room and state rooms aft.

The ship had general cargo capacity of 380,000 cubic feet (11,000 m^{3}), 47,000 cubic feet (1,300 m^{3}) refrigerated cargo space, and 16,000 cubic feet (450 m^{3}) for cold storage.

Prior to commercial passenger operation, the ship made a special twenty-four-hour cruise off New York with over seven hundred passenger agents representing companies and offices from across the nation. The guests were entertained with the full services passengers could expect, including dancing and viewing a new movie in the ship's theater.

== Commercial career ==
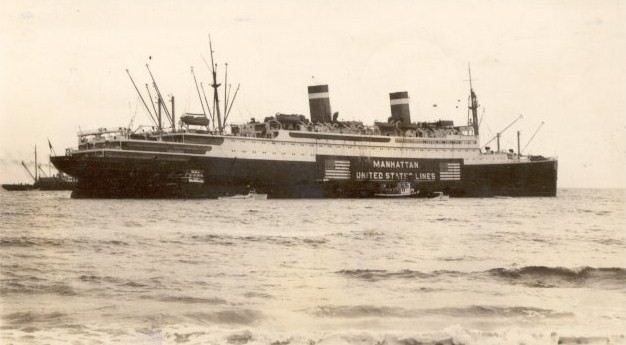
Manhattan beached at Palm Beach

Beginning in August 1932 Manhattan operated the New York – Hamburg route, one she would continue to serve with only one short break until December 1939, when President Roosevelt invoked the Neutrality Act against Germany. In July 1936, the ship carried the US Olympic team to the 1936 Summer Olympics in Berlin. In 1938 she carried some of the Kennedy family to the UK when Joseph P. Kennedy Sr. was appointed as ambassador.

Travel writer Douglas Ward claims in his book Berlitz Guide to Cruising that the alcoholic cocktail "Manhattan" was named after the ship; however, there is little evidence for confirmation. In the 1930s a one-way trip, off-season, in the cheapest cabin available cost the equivalent of roughly US$1,800 in 2019.

=== Kindertransport ===
On 22 March 1939 passengers embarking on Manhattan in Hamburg included 88 unaccompanied children who were Jewish refugees from Nazi Germany. The 24-hour journey from Hamburg to Southampton was part of the Kindertransport, as it later came to be known, between December 1938 and the outbreak of war in September 1939.

70% of the children (62 individuals) had been born in Berlin.

=== Early WWII ===
In October 1939 Manhattan carried passengers, mostly Americans, from England (then at war with Germany) to New York. On 4 February 1940, the ship was seized by British forces in Gibraltar and released after 390 sacks of mail bound for Germany were confiscated. From January 1940 until Italy's entry into World War II in June 1940 she sailed between New York and Genoa. On 12 July 1940, she transported passengers fleeing Europe from Lisbon to New York City; among them was Eugene Bullard, African-American combat pilot in World War I. On 12 January 1941, while in coastal service on the Atlantic seaboard, Manhattan ran aground 9 nmi (17 km) north of Palm Beach and was re-floated 22 days later with help from tugs after the ship was lightened. On 6 March 1941, the commander of the marine inspection bureau suspended the master and first officer after finding them guilty of negligence in the grounding. The master received an eight-month suspension while the first officer was suspended for one month.

== Troopship Service ==
=== Conversion ===
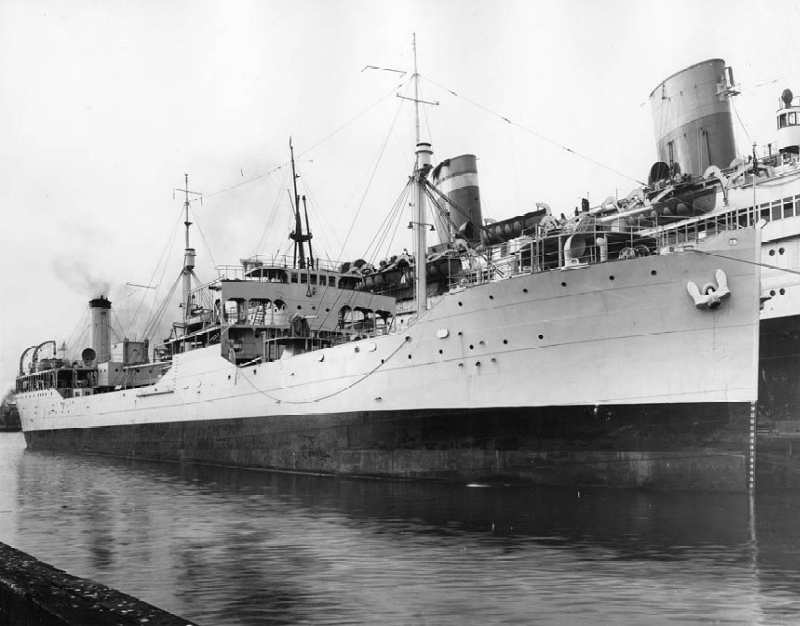
SS Manhattan (in background) undergoing conversion for Naval Service next to USS Laramie

After repairs at New York the ship was delivered to the War Shipping Administration (WSA) on 14 June 1941 which immediately delivered the ship to the Navy for operation under bareboat charter. The Navy renamed her Wakefield. Converted to a troop transport at Brooklyn, New York by the Robins Drydock Company, her costly furnishings and trappings of a luxury ocean liner were carefully removed and stored for future use. All of the ship's external surfaces were painted in Navy camouflage colors. On 15 June 1941, Wakefield was commissioned.

On 13 July 1941, Wakefield departed New York to participate in joint Navy – Marine – Army – Coast Guard amphibious training exercises at New River Inlet, North Carolina, in late July and early August.

=== Convoy WS-12X ===
The Atlantic Conference was held on August 9, 1941, in Placentia Bay, Newfoundland, between Prime Minister Winston Churchill and President Roosevelt. Besides the “official” agenda, Churchill hoped to obtain considerable assistance from the US, but the American President had his political hands tied. On 1 September 1941, Roosevelt received an urgent and most secret message asking for US Navy troopships manned by Navy crews and escorted by U.S.N. fighting ships to carry British troops for the purpose of reinforcing the Middle East. On 4 September the US destroyer, USS Greer, came under an unsuccessful U-boat attack. Roosevelt gave authority to the US Navy to “shoot to kill”. On September 5 the President assured the British leader that six vessels would be provided to carry twenty thousand troops and would be escorted by the American Navy.

The chief of Naval Operations ordered troop ships divisions seventeen and nineteen, on 26 September 1941, to prepare their vessels for approximately six months at sea. These transports were to load to capacity with food, ammunition medical supplies, fuel and water and were to arrive at Halifax, NS on or about 6 November and after the arrival of a British convoy from the UK were to load twenty thousand troops. The Prime Minister mentioned in his letter that it would be for the President to say what would be required in replacement if any of these ships were to be sunk by enemy action. Agreements were worked out for the troops to be carried as supernumeraries and rations to be paid out of Lend Lease Funds and officer laundry bills were to be paid in cash. All replenishments of provisions, general stores, fuel and water would be provided by the UK. Fuel and water would be charged for the escorts to the UK in Trinidad and Cape Town only. The troops would conform to US Navy and ships regulation. Intoxicating liquors were prohibited. It was further agreed that the troops were to rig and man their own anti-aircraft guns to augment the ships batteries.

In early November, Wakefield proceeded to Halifax, Nova Scotia, to take on board British troops.

Wakefield, with 6,000 men embarked, and five other transports USS Mount Vernon, USS West Point, USS Orizaba, USS Leonard Wood and USS Joseph T. Dickman got underway as Convoy WS12-X on 10 November 1941. Escorted by a strong screen – which, as far as Trinidad, included Ranger (CV-4) – the convoy was destined for Basra, Iraq.

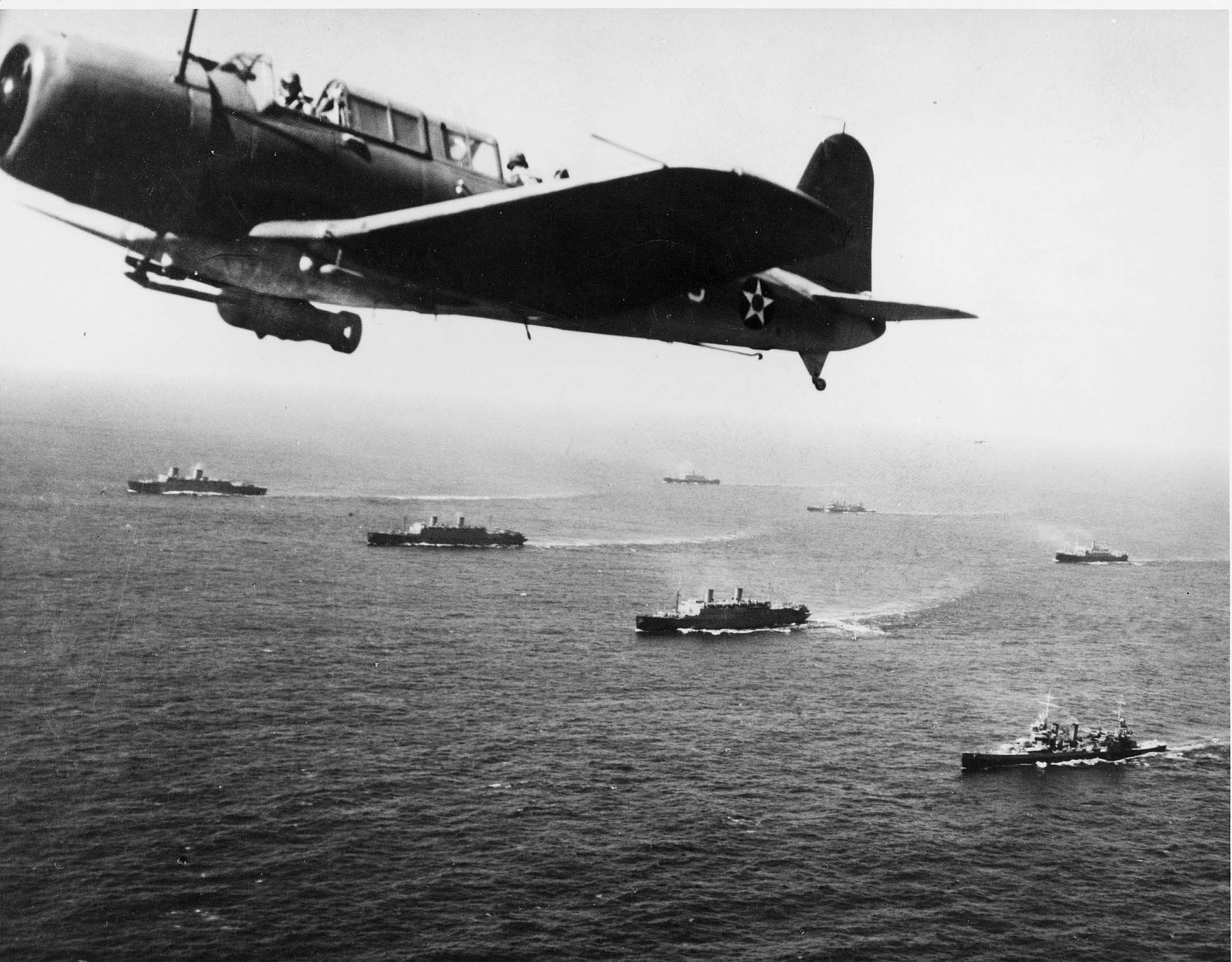
Convoy WS-12 en route to Cape Town, 1941

On 17 November 1941, the convoy reaches Trinidad. All ships were replenished, and the convoy departs Trinidad on 19 November 1941.On December 7 at 2000, the convoy receives a radio communication of the Japanese attack on Pearl Harbor.

On December 9, convoy WS12-X arrived in Cape Town, South Africa. At about 0800 on 13 December 1941, the troopships departed Cape Town headed for Bombay. At 650 on 21 December 1941, Mount Vernon and Orizaba detached from the convoy headed for Bombay, and are bound for Mombasa. The remainder of the convoy continued to Bombay under the escort of HMS Dorsetshire, arriving on 27 December 1941.

=== Convoy BM 11 ===
Wakefield sailed for Singapore at 1300 on 9 January, in "15-knot" convoy BM11. In addition to the two American ships, Wakefield and West Point, three British transports – Duchess of Bedford, Empress of Japan, and Empire Star – made up the remainder of the convoy.

On 29 January 1942, Convoy BM 11 arrived at Singapore to disembark troops doomed later to capture by the Japanese upon the fall of the city in the following month.

=== Bombed at Keppel Harbor ===
On 30 January 1942, Wakefield commenced fueling at Keppel Harbour for the return voyage and awaited the arrival of some 400 British women and children who were being evacuated to Ceylon. At 1100, lookouts spotted two formations of Japanese bombers – 27 planes in each – approaching the dock area at Keppel Harbor. Unhampered by anti-aircraft fire or British fighter planes, the enemy bombers droned overhead and released a brief rain of bombs on the waterfront. One bomb hit 50 yards (46 m) off Wakefield's port quarter, and another blew up in the dock area 40 feet (12 m) from the transport's bow before a third struck the ship's "B" deck and penetrated through to "C" deck where it exploded in the sick bay spaces. A fire broke out, but it was extinguished in less than one-half hour. The ship's official damage report notes that wood furniture and fittings contributed to the fires following such bomb hits, though in this case fires were brought under control quickly. The report noted that fire in a medical storeroom completely destroyed a wooden door allowing spread. (Note: U.S. Navy War Damage Reports contains numerous such reports for various ships.) One of the features of the ship as the liner Manhattan had been the lavish use of rare hardwood panels, moldings and finishings in passenger spaces. Using oxygen masks, fire-fighting and damage control crew extricated five dead and nine wounded. Medical assistance soon came from West Point.

Completing her fueling, Wakefield embarked her passengers and got underway soon thereafter, burying her dead at sea at 2200 and pushing on for Ceylon. After disembarking her passengers at Colombo, the ship found that port authorities would not cooperate in arranging for repair of her damage. Wakefield, therefore, promptly sailed for Bombay, India, where she was able to effect temporary repairs and embark 336 American evacuees. Steaming home via Cape Town, the transport reached New York on 23 March and then proceeded to Philadelphia for permanent repairs.

=== "Lone Wolf" Transport ===
Underway on 11 May 1942 for Hampton Roads, Wakefield arrived at Norfolk, Virginia two days later to load cargo in preparation for Naval Transportation Service Operating Plan Lone Wolf. This provided for Wakefield to travel, for the most part, unescorted – relying on her superior speed to outrun or outmaneuver enemy submarines. On 19 May 1942, she embarked 4,725 Marines and 309 Navy and Army passengers for transportation to the South Pacific and moved to Hampton Roads to form up with a convoy bound for the Panama Canal Zone. Arriving at Cristóbal on 25 May 1942, Wakefield was released from the convoy to proceed west. After Borie (DD-215) escorted her out of the Canal Zone, Wakefield proceeded independently to New Zealand and arrived at Wellington on 14 June. Departing one week later, the transport steamed via the Panama Canal and reached New York on 11 July 1942.

On 6 August 1942, Wakefield departed New York with Convoy AT-18 – the largest troop convoy yet assembled. A dozen troop transports made up the bulk of the convoy, escorted by 12 warships – cruisers and destroyers. After proceeding via Halifax to Great Britain, Wakefield received orders routing her and three other transports to the River Clyde, where they arrived without incident. On 27 August 1942, Wakefield departed the Clyde estuary as part of Convoy TA-18, bound for New York.

=== Onboard fire ===
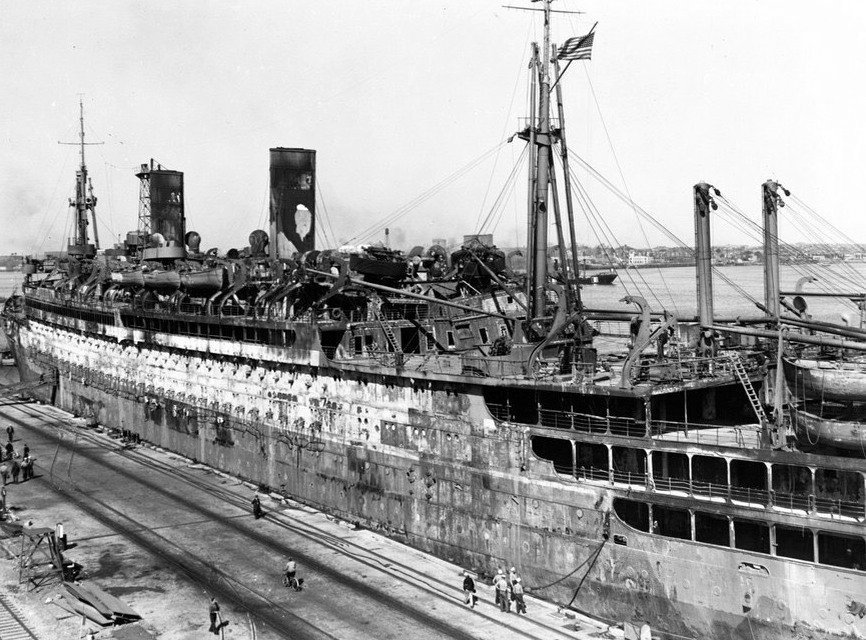
Aerial shot of Wakefield after a onboard fire

While the transport was en route to her destination, on the evening of 3 September 1942, fire broke out deep within the bowels of the ship and spread rapidly. In the port column of the formation, Wakefield swung to port to run before the wind while fire-fighting began immediately. Ready service ammunition was thrown overboard to prevent detonation, code room publications were secured, and sick bay and brig inmates were released. Mayo (DD-422) and Brooklyn (CL-40) closed to windward to take off passengers, a badly-burned officer, and members of the crew not needed to man pumps and hoses. Other survivors were disembarked by boat and raft, to be picked up forthwith by the screening ships.

At 2100, Brooklyn again came alongside to remove the remainder of the crew, while a special salvage detail boarded the ship. On 5 September 1942, towing operations commenced led by the Canadian salvage vessel Foundation Franklin and the big transport was put aground at McNab's Cove, near Halifax, at 1740 on the 8th. When fire-fighting details arrived alongside to board and commence the mammoth operation, fires still burned in three holds and in the crew's quarters on two deck levels. Four days later, the last flames had been extinguished, and the ship was re-floated on the 14th. On 18 September 1942 the ship was purchased by the Navy.

While Wakefield was undergoing partial repairs in Halifax harbor, a torrential rainstorm threatened to fill the damaged ship with water and capsize her at her berth. Torrents of rain, at times in cloudburst proportions, poured into the ship and caused her to list heavily. Salvage crews, meanwhile, cut holes in the ship's sides above the waterline, draining away the water to permit the ship to regain an even keel. For the next 10 days, the salvagers engaged in extensive initial repair work – cleaning up the ship, pumping out debris, patching up holes, and preparing the vessel for her voyage to the Boston Navy Yard for complete rebuilding.

=== Total rebuild ===
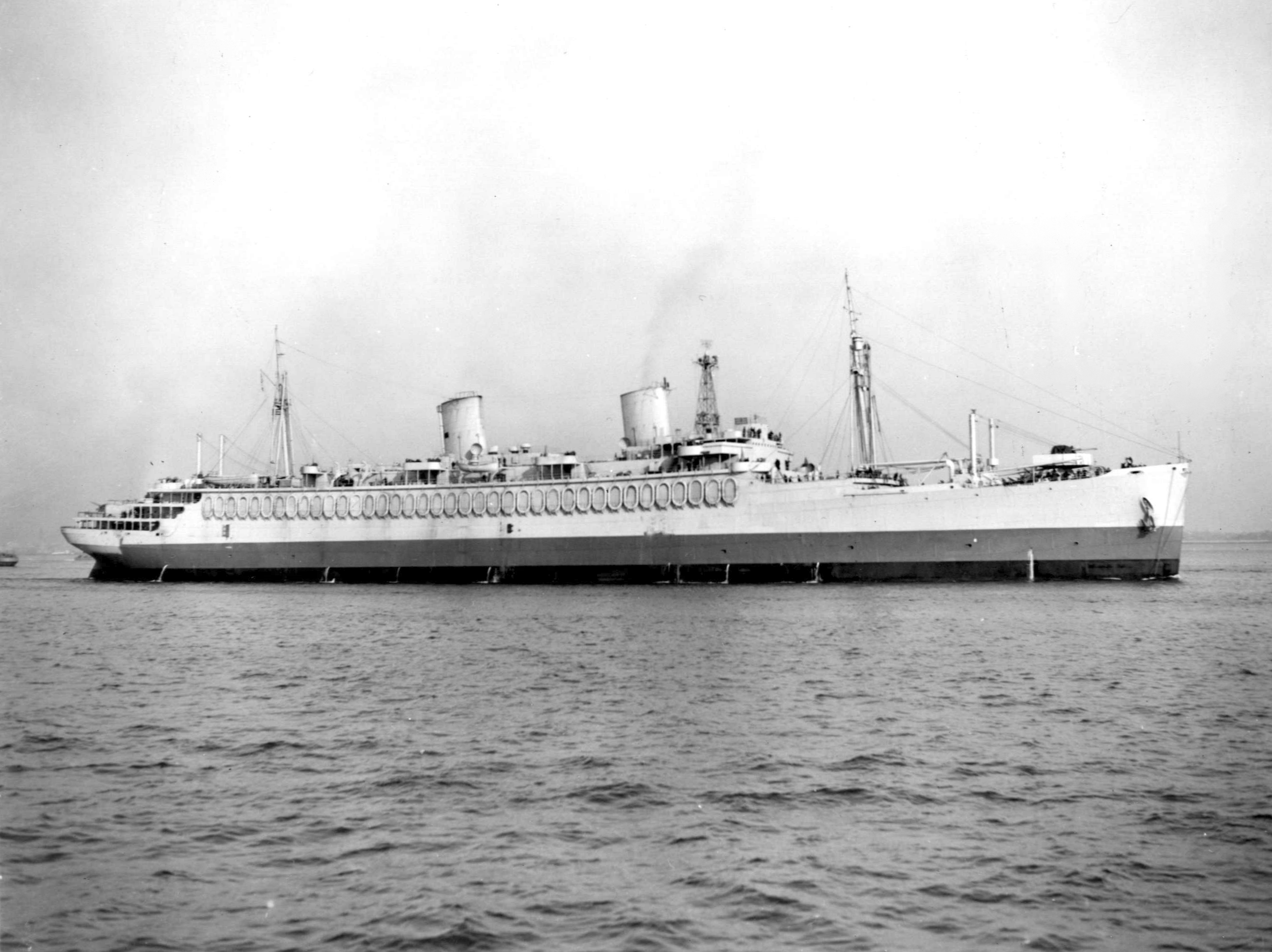
Wakefield after rebuild, 1944

Temporarily decommissioned, the charred liner proceeded for Boston with a four-tug tow, and was declared a "constructive total loss." The Government purchased the hulk from the United States Lines and stripped the vessel to the waterline. The repairs and alterations began in the fall of 1942, and lasted through 1943. On 10 February 1944, Wakefield was recommissioned at Boston.

=== Various transport roles ===
She departed Boston on 13 April 1944, beginning the first of 23 round trips in the Atlantic theater, and three in the Pacific. Between 13 April 1944 and 1 February 1946, Wakefield transported 110,563 troops to Europe and brought some 106,674 men back to America – a total of 217,237 passengers.

In many cases, Wakefield operated as a "lone wolf", except for air coverage a few miles out of a port. Her primary port of call in the European theater was Liverpool – visited so often in fact that the transport's crew nicknamed her "The Boston and Liverpool Ferry." The average round-trip voyage took 18 days.

After D-Day, 6 June 1944, Wakefield began the first of her trips as a casualty-evacuation ship, bringing home wounded GIs. On occasion, she also brought back German prisoners of war for internment in the United States. Sometimes she even carried both evacuees and prisoners on the same voyage. After 13 trips to Liverpool, Wakefield was sent to the Mediterranean theater to carry men and equipment to Italy. She made three visits to Naples and a run each to Marseille, Oran, Taranto, Le Havre, and Cherbourg-Octeville. Returning from her 22nd voyage to Europe, the transport departed Boston on 4 December 1945 for Taku, China, and a Magic Carpet mission – returning to San Diego, California, on 1 February 1946. Two round trips to Guam, in February through April 1946, rounded out the ship's active service as a Navy transport.

=== Decommissioning ===
Mooring at New York on 27 May 1946, Wakefield was decommissioned on 16 June 1946 – five years to the day since she first entered service. There she was laid up in reserve, out of commission, with the Maritime Administration's Hudson River Reserve Fleet at Jones Point, New York. She was struck from the Navy Register in 1959. She was sold for scrap to Union Minerals & Alloys Corporation for $263,000 in 1965.

=== Awards ===
Wakefield earned one battle star for her World War II service.

== See also ==
- Short Documentary – The Story Of A Transport: USS Wakefield (1944)

== Bibliography ==
- Gibbs, CR Vernon (1957). Passenger Liners of the Western Ocean (2nd ed). London: Staples Press Limited. LCCN 57001880
- New York Shipbuilding Corporation (1948). 50 Years: New York Shipbuilding Corporation. Camden:house publication
- Newell, Gordon (1963). Ocean Liners of the 20th Century (1st ed.). Seattle: Superior Publishing Company. LCCN 63–18494
