= USS Moonstone =

Patrol vessel of the United States Navy

Coordinates: 38.5008°N 74.111°W

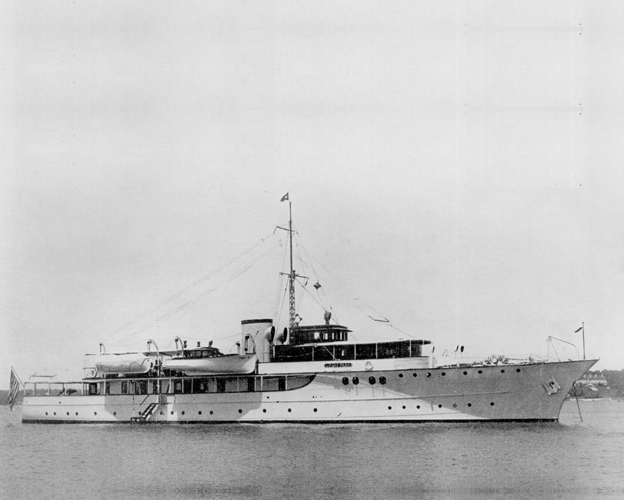
- USS Moonstone (PYc-9)

History

United States
- Name: Moonstone
- Builder: Germaniawerft
- Acquired: 10 February 1941
- Commissioned: 10 April 1941
- Stricken: 26 October 1943
- Fate: Sunk in collision 16 October 1943

General characteristics
- Class & type: patrol boat
- Displacement: 645 tons
- Length: 171 ft 9 in (52.35 m)
- Beam: 26 ft 9 in (8.15 m)
- Draught: 10 ft 6 in (3.20 m)
- Propulsion: 800 bhp diesel engines, two shafts
- Speed: 12 knots
- Complement: 50 officers and enlisted
- Armament: 1 × 3"/50 gun mount; 2 × .30 cal (7.62 mm) machine guns; 2 × depth charge tracks

USS Moonstone (PYc-9) was a coastal patrol yacht in the service of the United States Navy. She was built in 1929 as Nancy Baker by Germaniawerft in Kiel, Germany, later renamed Mona, and subsequently acquired by the Navy as the Lone Star on 10 February 1941. Renamed Moonstone and designated PYc-9, she was converted for U.S. Navy service in Jacksonville, Florida, and commissioned on 10 April 1941. She was named for the gemstone moonstone.

On 2 May 1941, Moonstone sailed for patrol duty with the Panamanian Sea Frontier. She later moved to Ecuador on 2 January 1943 to aid in training the Ecuadorian Navy. In March 1943 she sailed to Charleston, South Carolina, to prepare for permanent transfer to Ecuador. On her return at Balboa, Panama, in July 1943, cracks were discovered in the cylinder blocks of her engine, and she was sent north for repairs. On 16 October 1943, off the mouth of Delaware's Indian River she collided with the destroyer USS Greer (DD-145) and sank immediately. All but one of Moonstones's complement survived. She was struck from the Naval Register on 26 October 1943.

Her wreck lies 35 miles (56 km) southeast of Cape May, New Jersey, in 130 feet (40 m) of water.
