= SS Washington =

Transatlantic luxury ocean liner (1932–1965)

- A post card depicting SS Washington

History

United States
- Ordered: 24 May 1930
- Builder: New York Shipbuilding Corp., Camden, New Jersey
- Laid down: 20 January 1931
- Launched: 20 August 1932
- Maiden voyage: 10 May 1933
- In service: 1933–1940, 1947–1957
- Out of service: 1962
- Refit: 1947, 1955
- Home port: New York, New York
- Nickname(s): "President Washington's Ship"
- Fate: Sold for scrap, 1965
- Notes: Flagship from 1934–1940. Never returned to United States Line after World War II.

General characteristics
- Class & type: Manhattan Class
- Tonnage: 24,289 GRT
- Length: 705 ft 3 in (214.96 m)
- Beam: 86 ft 0 in (26.21 m)
- Decks: 8
- Propulsion: B&W boilers, Parsons steam turbines (30,000 shaft HP) - twin screw
- Speed: 20.5 knots
- Complement: 1130 passengers: 580 in cabin class, 400 in tourist, and 150 in third class
- Crew: 565
- Armament: (as Mount Vernon) four 5" guns, four 3" guns

SS Washington was an ocean liner of the United States Lines, named after the US capital city. On June 6, 1941, the Washington was commissioned as the troopship USS Mount Vernon. In 1947, one deck was restored to pre-war condition and the ship resumed commercial service. However, The ship was again used by the U.S. Government, transporting soldiers and their families. Washington was laid up in 1953 and scrapped in 1965.

== Construction ==
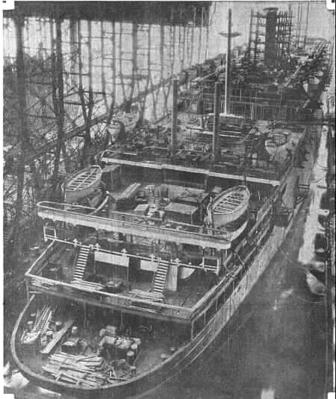
Washington under construction in Camden, New Jersey.

The Washington was ordered by Transatlantic Steamship Company and laid down on January 20, 1931 in Shipway O at New York Shipbuilding in Camden, New Jersey. By the time the vessel was launched on 20 August 1932, Transatlantic Steamship's assets had been acquired by International Mercantile Marine, Washington was delivered and went into service for the United States Lines on May 2, 1933.

At the time of their construction, Washington and her sister ship SS Manhattan, also built by New York Shipbuilding, were the largest liners ever built in the United States, a status they held until the 1939 launch of SS America. Washington and Manhattan were two of the few pure ocean liners built by New York Shipbuilding, which had previously built a large number of cargo liners. Accommodations were 580 in Cabin class, 400 in Tourist, and 150 Third class. Both ships were to garner a reputation for a very high standard of service and luxury.

United States Lines signed contracts in 1931 for the Manhattan and Washington for approximately $21 million each.

== Commercial career ==
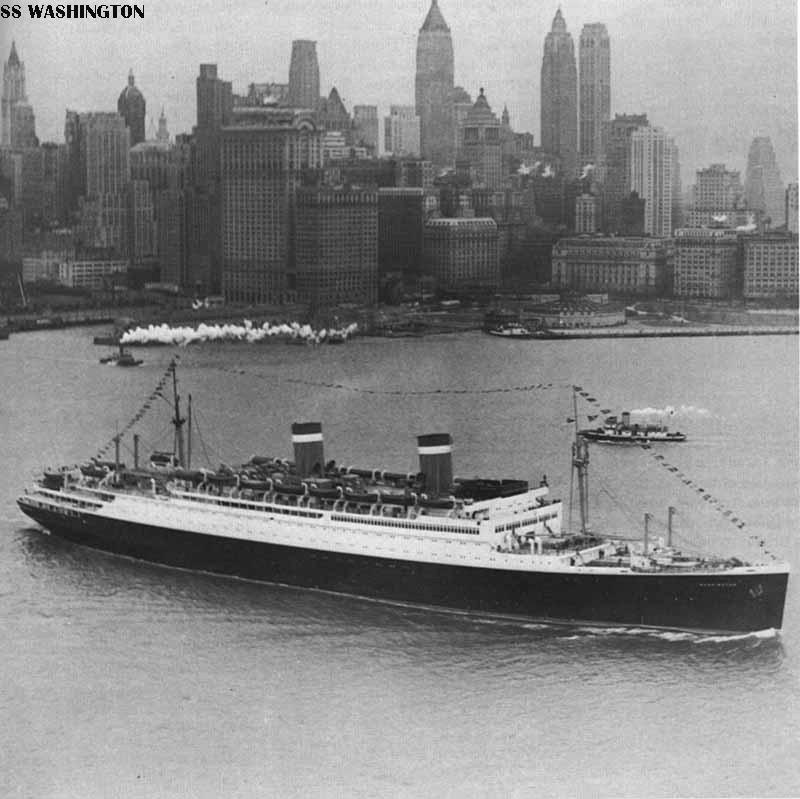
Washington at New York.

Washington joined her sister ship Manhattan on the New York–Hamburg route, a route she continued to serve with only one short break until December 1939, when President Franklin Roosevelt invoked the 1939 Neutrality Act against Germany. Both ships then moved to the New York–Naples–Genoa run until June 1940, during when the Battle of France was ongoing. Its 'next-to-the-last' voyage from Europe to America, made specifically to repatriate US citizens, departed from Genoa, Lisbon, Le Verdon-sur-Mer (near Bordeaux, France, 8 June) and Galway (June 12), encountered a German U-boat off the coast of Portugal on the morning of 11 June and arrived in New York on 21 June. Austrian jurist Hans Kelsen and his family embarked Washington in Lisbon on 1 June. With the increasing danger from German submarines, Washington and Manhattan were switched to the New York–San Francisco service via the Panama Canal.

== Military career ==
On June 6, 1941, Washington was requisitioned and leased by the US Navy. She was sent to the Philadelphia Navy Yard, where she was converted into a troopship and subsequently commissioned as the USS Mount Vernon. During Navy service, Mount Vernon frequently sailed in company with the other United States Lines fast liners SS Manhattan (as USS Wakefield) and SS America (as USS West Point), most notably on a secret assignment carrying British troops to Singapore—a convoy mission which began a month before the attack on Pearl Harbor.

In January 1946, Mount Vernon was decommissioned, mothballed, and returned to the U.S. Maritime Commission, regaining the name Washington. Her luxurious appointments had been carefully removed and stored, and she returned to commercial service in February 1947. Only one deck was restored to its pre-war standards. However, the ship provided accommodations for 1106 passengers in a single class. United States Lines returned her to the U.S. government in October 1951, and the final phase of her career found her transporting soldiers and their families between New York and Bremerhaven. Washington was laid up in reserve in the Hudson River in 1953, and she was scrapped at Kearny, New Jersey in 1965.

There is a large scale builder's model of Washington in the United States Merchant Marine Academy museum in Kings Point, New York.

== Sources ==
- Gibbs, C.R. Vernon (1957). Passenger Liners of the Western Ocean (2nd ed). London: Staples Press Limited. LCCN 57001880
- Marine_Engineering (1933). Marine Engineering. Simmons-Boardman Publishing Corporation.
- New York Shipbuilding Corporation (1948). 50 Years: New York Shipbuilding Corporation. Camden:house publication
- Newell, Gordon (1963). Ocean Liners of the 20th Century (1st ed.). Seattle: Superior Publishing Company. LCCN 63–18494
