= USS Greer =

Wickes-class U.S. Navy destroyer in service between 1918 and 1945

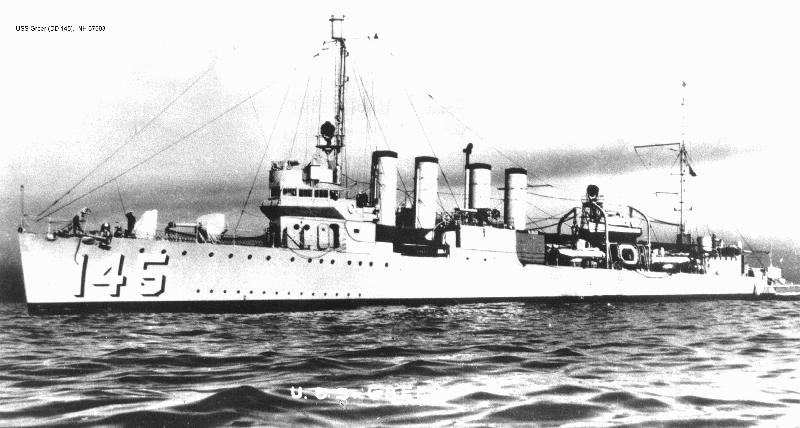
- USS Greer (DD-145)

History

United States
- Namesake: James A. Greer
- Builder: William Cramp & Sons, Philadelphia
- Yard number: 460
- Laid down: 24 February 1918
- Launched: 1 August 1918
- Commissioned: 31 December 1918
- Decommissioned: 22 June 1922
- Recommissioned: 31 March 1930
- Decommissioned: 13 January 1937
- Recommissioned: 4 October 1939
- Decommissioned: 19 July 1945
- Stricken: 13 August 1945
- Fate: Sold for scrapping, 30 November 1945

General characteristics
- Class & type: Wickes-class destroyer
- Displacement: 1,165 tons
- Length: 314 ft 4 in (95.81 m)
- Beam: 30 ft 11 in (9.42 m)
- Draft: 9 ft (2.74 m)
- Speed: 35 knots (65 km/h)
- Complement: 133 officers and enlisted
- Armament: 4 × 4"/50 calibre guns (102 mm), 1 × 3 in (76 mm), 12 × 21 inch (533 mm) torpedo tubes.

USS Greer (DD–145) was a Wickes-class destroyer in the United States Navy, the first ship named for Rear Admiral James A. Greer (1833–1904). In what became known as the "Greer incident," she became the first US Navy ship to fire on a German ship, three months before the United States officially entered World War II. The incident led President Franklin D. Roosevelt to issue what became known as his "shoot-on-sight" order, with the intention of creating a casus belli in the Atlantic, provoking Germany to declare war on the US.

Greer was launched by William Cramp & Sons Ship & Engine Building Co., Philadelphia, 1 August 1918; sponsored by Miss Evelina Porter Gleaves, daughter of Rear Admiral Albert Gleaves; and commissioned 31 December 1918.

== Service history ==
=== 1919 to 1941 ===
Greer's shake down took her to the Azores, from which she rendezvoused with George Washington, carrying President Woodrow Wilson home from the Versailles Peace Conference, and escorted her to the United States. After exercises in coastal waters, Greer was assigned to Trepassey Bay, Newfoundland, for duties during a transatlantic flight by four Navy seaplanes, one of which, NC-4, safely completed the historic undertaking. After further training exercises and a European cruise, Greer was assigned to the Pacific Fleet, reaching San Francisco 18 November 1919.

Six months' duty with the Pacific Fleet terminated 25 March 1920, when Greer sailed to join the Asiatic Fleet. After standing by off Shanghai to protect American lives and property during riots there in May, Greer sailed to Port Arthur and Dairen on intelligence missions and returned to Cavite, Philippines, for fleet exercises. The destroyer returned to San Francisco 29 September 1921 via Guam, Midway, and Pearl Harbor. Greer decommissioned at San Diego 22 June 1922, and was placed in reserve.

Greer recommissioned 31 March 1930. Operating with the Battle Fleet, she participated in a variety of exercises along the coast from Alaska to Panama, with an occasional voyage to Hawaii. Transferred to the Scouting Fleet 1 February 1931, she cruised off Panama, Haiti, and Cuba before being attached to the Rotating Reserve from August 1933 to February 1934. Training exercises, battle practice, and plane guard duty filled Greer's peacetime routine for the next 2 years. She sailed for the East Coast and duty with the Training Squadron 3 June 1936. After conducting Naval Reserve cruises throughout that summer, Greer sailed for the Philadelphia Navy Yard 28 September and decommissioned there 13 January 1937.

As war swept across Europe, Greer recommissioned 4 October 1939 and joined Destroyer Division 61 as flagship. After patrolling the East Coast and Caribbean, Greer joined the Neutrality Patrol in February 1940. Detached from this duty 5 October, the destroyer patrolled the Caribbean that winter. She joined other American ships on operations in the North Atlantic early in 1941, out of Reykjavík, Iceland, and NS Argentia, Newfoundland. United States ships, as non-belligerents, could not attack Axis submarines; but, as the German High Command stepped up the pace of the war through the summer of 1941, Greer found herself involved in an incident which brought America's entry into the war nearer.

=== The Greer incident, September 1941 ===
The "Greer incident" occurred on 4 September. The United States claimed that a German submarine (later identified as U-652) fired the first shot upon Greer, but made no contact. When news of the encounter reached the United States, public concern ran high. Initial reports reported that a British aircraft aided in repelling the attack.

In response, Germany claimed "that the attack had not been initiated by the German submarine; on the contrary, ... the submarine had been attacked with depth bombs, pursued continuously in the German blockade zone, and assailed by depth bombs until midnight." The communique implied that the US destroyer had dropped the first depth bombs. Germany accused President Roosevelt of "endeavoring with all the means at his disposal to provoke incidents for the purpose of baiting the American people into the war."

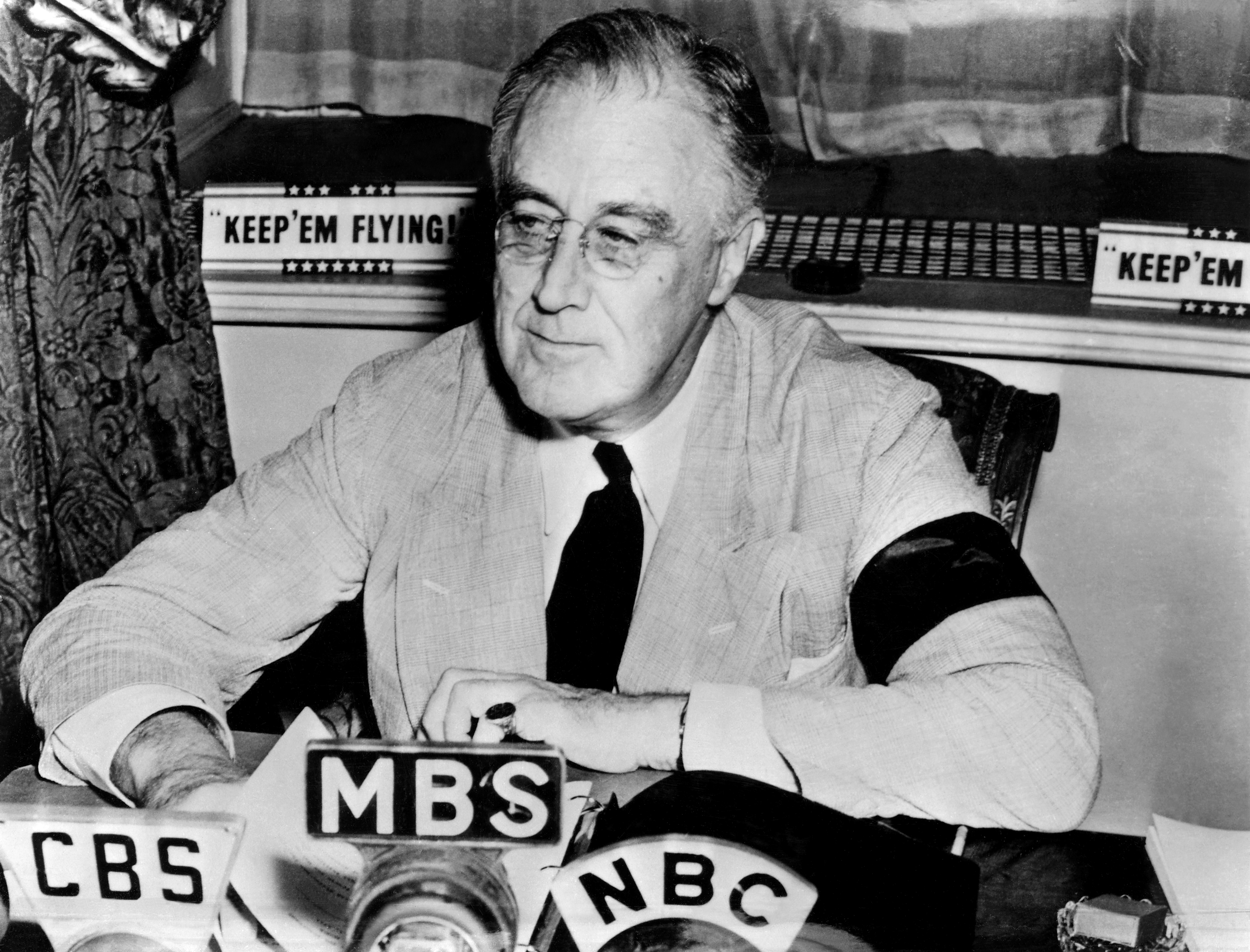
Franklin D. Roosevelt delivering his fireside chat of 11 September 1941

The United States Department of the Navy replied that the German claims were inaccurate and that "the initial attack in the engagement was made by the submarine on the Greer." Roosevelt made the Greer incident the principal focus of one of his famed "fireside chats", where he explained a new order he issued as commander-in-chief that escalated America nearer to outright involvement in the European war. In Roosevelt's words:

The Greer was flying the American flag. Her identity as an American ship was unmistakable. She was then and there attacked by a submarine. Germany admits that it was a German submarine. The submarine deliberately fired a torpedo at the Greer, followed by another torpedo attack. In spite of what Hitler's propaganda bureau has invented, and in spite of what any American obstructionist organisation may prefer to believe, I tell you the blunt fact that the German submarine fired first upon this American destroyer without warning, and with the deliberate design to sink her.

Declaring that Germany had been guilty of "an act of piracy," President Roosevelt announced what became known as his "shoot-on-sight" order: that Nazi submarines' "very presence in any waters which America deems vital to its defense constitutes an attack. In the waters which we deem necessary for our defense, American naval vessels and American planes will no longer wait until Axis submarines lurking under the water, or Axis raiders on the surface of the sea, strike their deadly blow—first." He concluded:

The aggression is not ours. [Our concern] is solely defense. But let this warning be clear. From now on, if German or Italian vessels of war enter the waters, the protection of which is necessary for American defense, they do so at their own peril. … The sole responsibility rests upon Germany. There will be no shooting unless Germany continues to seek it.

Senator David I. Walsh (Democrat–Massachusetts), isolationist Chair of the Senate Committee on Naval Affairs, scheduled a committee hearing to unearth the details of the incident, which prompted Admiral Harold R. Stark, Chief of Naval Operations, to issue a written report. Stark's account, made public in October 1941, confirmed that Greer dropped its charges only after the submarine fired its first torpedo at it, but revealed that Greer had gone in search of the submarine after its presence was noted by the British aircraft. Admiral Stark's report stated:

At 0840 that morning, Greer, carrying mail and passengers to Iceland, "was informed by a British plane of the presence of a submerged submarine about 10 miles [(16 km)] directly ahead. … Acting on the information from the British plane the Greer proceeded to search for the submarine and at 0920 she located the submarine directly ahead by her underwater sound equipment. The Greer proceeded then to trail the submarine and broadcast the submarine's position. This action, taken by the Greer, was in accordance with her orders, that is, to give out information but not to attack." The British plane continued in the vicinity of the submarine until 1032, but prior to her departure the plane dropped four depth charges in the vicinity of the submarine. The Greer maintained [its] contact until about 1248. During this period (three hours 28 minutes), the Greer manoeuvred so as to keep the submarine ahead. At 1240 the submarine changed course and closed the Greer. At 1245 an impulse bubble (indicating the discharge of a torpedo by the submarine) was sighted close aboard the Greer. At 1249 a torpedo track was sighted crossing the wake of the ship from starboard to port, distant about 100 yards [(100 m)] astern. At this time the Greer lost sound contact with the submarine. At 1300 the Greer started searching for the submarine and at 1512 … the Greer made underwater contact with a submarine. The Greer attacked immediately with depth charges.

Stark went on to report that the result of the encounter was undetermined, although most assumed from the German response that the sub had survived. In fact, U-652 had indeed survived and promptly headed west to participate in the devastating U-boat pack attack on convoy SC 42 in early September.

Historian Charles A. Beard would later write that Admiral Stark's report to the Senate Committee "made the President's statement... appear in some respects inadequate, and, in others, incorrect." In his postwar summary of the Stark report, Beard emphasised that (1) Greer had chased the sub and held contact with the sub for 3 hours and 28 minutes before the sub fired its first torpedo; (2) Greer then lost contact with the sub, searched, and after re-establishing contact two hours later, attacked immediately with depth charges, then (3) searched for three more hours before proceeding to its destination.

The Stark report's account of how Greer's engagement began caused Pulitzer-prizewinning New York Times reporter Arthur Krock to address it (and the Nazi sub engagements with the Kearny, and the Reuben James) when speaking about "who 'attacked' whom." Krock defined the term "attack" as "an onset, an aggressive initiation of combat, a move which is the antithesis of 'defense.'" "In that definition," he said, "all three of our destroyers attacked the German submarines."

A 2005 book concluded that Senator Walsh's "very aggressive actions in the USS Greer case prevented war from breaking out in the Atlantic."

The episode did not escalate into war because both Hitler and Roosevelt were being very cautious. Hitler concentrated his resources on defeating the Soviet Union, while Roosevelt was building up a broad base of support for aggressive patrols of the North Atlantic.

=== 1941 to 1945 ===
Greer remained in the North Atlantic through 1941, shepherding convoys to and from MOMP, the mid-ocean meeting point at which American ships took over escort duties from the hard-pressed Royal Navy. After overhaul at Boston, she turned south 3 March 1942 to resume patrol duty in the Caribbean. In addition to regular escort duties, Greer performed many other tasks, including rescuing 39 victims of German U-boats. In May she stood guard off Pointe a Pitre, Guadeloupe, trying to keep the Vichy French government from getting Jeanne d'Arc to sea.

Sailing from Guantanamo Bay 23 January 1943, Greer sailed to Boston then headed for the Atlantic convoy duty. Departing NS Argentia, Newfoundland 1 March 1943, she escorted merchantmen for Northern Ireland. During heavy North Atlantic gales, Convoy SC 121 lost seven ships to three separate U-boat attacks before reaching Londonderry Port on 13 March. Greer then escorted 40 merchantmen on the return voyage without incident, and continued on to Hampton Roads 15 April with tanker Chicopee.

After exercises in Casco Bay, Greer departed New York City 11 May with a convoy of 83 ships. Reaching Casablanca, Morocco, 1 June, the destroyer patrolled off the North African port and then recrossed the Atlantic, arriving New York 27 June. After another run to Northern Ireland, Greer returned to New York 11 August.

After steaming to Norfolk, she sailed for the British West Indies 26 August to serve briefly as plane guard to Santee. She rendezvoused with a convoy in the Caribbean and headed for North Africa. Diverted to New York, she docked there 14 September. Routine training exercises turned into tragedy 15 October as Greer collided with Moonstone off the mouth of Indian River, Delaware Capes (35 miles (56 km) south-east of Cape May, New Jersey). Moonstone sank in less than 4 minutes, but Greer rescued all the crew but one.

After repairs, the destroyer escorted the Free French cruiser Gloire from New York to Norfolk. Greer sailed 26 December with another Casablanca-bound convoy and after an uneventful crossing returned to Boston 9 February 1944. This was the final transatlantic crossing for the old four-stack destroyer, as she and her sister ships were replaced by newer and faster escorts.

=== Convoys escorted ===
Convoy	Escort Group	Dates	Notes
ON 24		13–15 Oct 1941	from Iceland to Newfoundland prior to US declaration of war
SC 48		16–17 Oct 1941	battle reinforcement prior to US declaration of war
ON 37		22–30 Nov 1941	from Iceland to Newfoundland prior to US declaration of war
HX 165		17–24 Dec 1941	from Newfoundland to Iceland
ON 51		2–11 Jan 1942	from Iceland to Newfoundland
HX 170		16–17 Jan 1942	from Newfoundland to Iceland
SC 121	MOEF group A3	3–12 March 1943	from Newfoundland to Northern Ireland
ON 175	MOEF group A3	25 March-8 April 1943	from Northern Ireland to Newfoundland

=== Auxiliary service ===
The veteran destroyer spent the remainder of her long career performing a variety of necessary tasks in American waters. After a tour of submarine training duty at New London, Greer became plane guard for several new aircraft carriers during the summer of 1944. Operating from various New England ports, she served with Ranger, Tripoli, Mission Bay, and Wake Island. Sailing to Key West in February 1945, Greer continued plane guard duty until 11 June when she sailed to the Philadelphia Navy Yard.

Greer decommissioned 19 July 1945. Her name was stricken from the Navy list 13 August and her hull was sold to the Boston Metal Salvage Company of Baltimore, Maryland on 30 November 1945.

== Awards ==
- American Defense Service Medal with "A" device
- American Campaign Medal
- European-African-Middle Eastern Campaign Medal with one battle star
- World War II Victory Medal

As of 2017, no other ship in the United States Navy has borne this name.
