= List of passenger ships built in the United States =

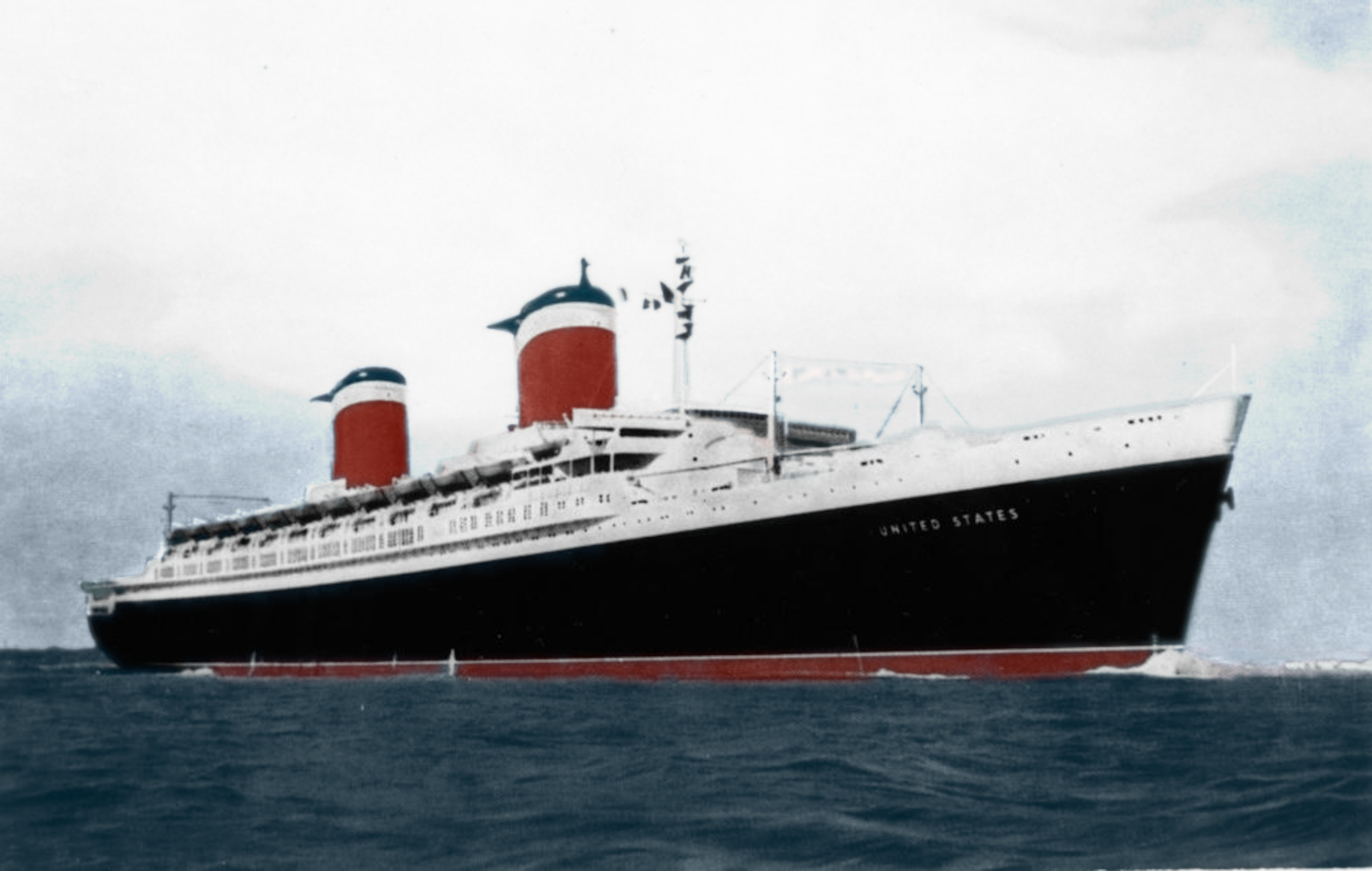
SS United States, the largest passenger ship built in the U.S.

Shipyards in the United States built dozens of deepwater passenger ships from 1900 to 1958.

Their construction was spurred by the Merchant Marine Act of 1920, which says that only ships built and registered in the United States may sail solely between the country's ports, and by the Merchant Marine Act of 1928, whose government loans led the International Mercantile Marine Company and other U.S. shipping lines to order new ships through World War II.

The largest passenger liner ever built in the United States was the SS United States, completed in 1952. The last large passenger liner to be completed was Moore-McCormack Lines' SS Argentina in 1958.

The only U.S.-built deepwater passenger ships still in existence are the former converted cargo liner SS Medina (hotel ship), cargo/passenger liner NS Savannah (museum ship), and the partly US-built Pride of America (still in service).

Today, only small coastal and river passenger ships are still built in the U.S. and fly the American flag.

== Shipyards ==
The primary yards that built passenger ships in the 20th century include:

- Newport News Shipbuilding & Drydock Co., Ltd., Newport News, Virginia
- Ingalls Shipyards, Pascagoula, Mississippi
- Fore River Shipyard, Bethlehem Shipbuilding Corporation, Quincy, Massachusetts
- William Cramp & Sons, Philadelphia, Pennsylvania
- New York Shipbuilding of Camden, New Jersey
- Federal Shipbuilding and Dry Dock Company, Kearny, NJ

== List ==
Name	Entered service	Line built or rebuilt For	Shipyard	Designer	Status	Notes
SS Morro Castle	1900	Ward Line	William Cramp & Sons, Philadelphia		Scrapped 1926	Laid down for Plant Line in 1899
SS Kroonland	1902	Red Star Line	William Cramp & Sons, Philadelphia		Scrapped 1927	
SS Finland	1902	Red Star Line	William Cramp & Sons, Philadelphia		Scrapped 1928	
SS Minnesota	1905	Great Northern Steamship Company	Eastern Shipbuilding Co., New London, Connecticut		Scrapped 1923	
SS Dakota	1905	Great Northern Steamship Company	Eastern Shipbuilding Co., New London, Connecticut		Wrecked & sank 1907	
SS Saratoga	1907	Ward Line	William Cramp & Sons, Philadelphia		Scrapped 1939	
1910s
SS Great Northern	1914	Great Northern Pacific Steam Ship Company	William Cramp & Sons, Philadelphia		Scrapped 1948	
SS Northern Pacific	1915	Great Northern Pacific Steam Ship Company	William Cramp & Sons, Philadelphia		Burned and sank 1922	
SS Oriente	1917	Ward Line	William Cramp & Sons, Philadelphia		Scrapped 1957	Renamed SS Siboney for Ward Line after World War I
SS Orizaba	1917	Ward Line	William Cramp & Sons, Philadelphia		Scrapped 1963	Commandeered by US Navy prior to launch for World War I, entered passenger service in 1920
1920s
SS President Roosevelt	1922	United States Line	New York Shipbuilding of Camden, New Jersey		Scrapped 1948	Originally built as a Harris-classattack transport towards the end of World War I, as Peninsula State, entered commercial service after her completion.
SS Coamo	1925	New York and Porto Rico Steamship Company	Newport News Shipbuilding and Drydock Company in Newport News, Virginia		Torpedoed & Sank 1942	
SS Malolo	1927	Matson Line	William Cramp & Sons, Philadelphia	Gibbs & Cox	Scrapped 1977	
SS Iroquois	1927	Clyde Steamship Line	Newport News Shipbuilding and Drydock Company in Newport News, Virginia		Scrapped 1981	
SS Shawnee	July 1927	Clyde Steamship Line	Newport News Shipbuilding and Drydock Company in Newport News, Virginia		Burned 1949	
SS Yarmouth	September 1927	Eastern Steamship Line	William Cramp & Sons, Philadelphia	Theodore E. Ferris	Scrapped 1979	
SS Evangeline	October 1927	Eastern Steamship Line	William Cramp & Sons, Philadelphia	Theodore E. Ferris	Burned & Sank 1965	
SS California	1928	Panama Pacific Lines	Newport News Shipbuilding and Drydock Company in Newport News, Virginia		Scrapped 1964	First major ocean liner built with turbo-electric transmission.
SS Virginia	1928	Panama Pacific Lines	Newport News Shipbuilding and Drydock Company in Newport News, Virginia		Scrapped 1964	
SS Pennsylvania	1929	Panama Pacific Lines	Newport News Shipbuilding and Drydock Company in Newport News, Virginia		Scrapped 1964	
1930s
SS Morro Castle	1930	Ward Line	Newport News Shipbuilding and Drydock Company in Newport News, Virginia	Theodore E. Ferris	Burned 1934	
SS Oriente	1930	Ward Line	Newport News Shipbuilding and Drydock Company in Newport News, Virginia	Theodore E. Ferris	Scrapped 1957	
SS President Hoover	1930	Dollar Steamship Lines	Newport News Shipbuilding and Drydock Company in Newport News, Virginia		Wrecked in storm 1937	
SS Borinquen	1931	New York and Porto Rico Steamship Company	Fore River Shipyard, Bethlehem Shipbuilding Corporation, Quincy, Massachusetts	Theodore E. Ferris	Wrecked 1970	
SS President Coolidge	1931	Dollar Steamship Lines	Newport News Shipbuilding and Drydock Company in Newport News, Virginia		Sunk by Mine 1942	
SS St John	1932	Eastern Steamship Line	Newport News Shipbuilding and Drydock Company in Newport News, Virginia	Theodore E. Ferris	Scrapped 1959	
SS Mariposa	1932	Matson Line	Fore River Shipyard, Bethlehem Shipbuilding Corporation, Quincy, Massachusetts	Gibbs & Cox	Scrapped 1974	
SS Monterey	1932	Matson Line	Fore River Shipyard, Bethlehem Shipbuilding Corporation, Quincy, Massachusetts	Gibbs & Cox	Sank on way to Scrapyard 2000	
SS Acadia	1932	Eastern Steamship Line	Newport News Shipbuilding and Drydock Company in Newport News, Virginia	Theodore E. Ferris	Sold 1955	
SS Manhattan	1932	United States Lines	New York Shipbuilding of Camden, New Jersey		Scrapped 1965	Originally ordered for the Transatlantic Steamship Company
SS Santa Rosa	1932	Grace Line	Federal Shipbuilding and Dry Dock Company Kearny, NJ	Gibbs & Cox	Scrapped 1989	
SS Santa Paula	1933	Grace Line	Federal Shipbuilding and Dry Dock Company Kearny, NJ	Gibbs & Cox	Scrapped 1971	
SS Santa Lucia	1933	Grace Line	Federal Shipbuilding and Dry Dock Company Kearny, NJ	Gibbs & Cox	Torpedoed & Sank 1942	
SS Lurline	1933	Matson Line	Fore River Shipyard, Bethlehem Shipbuilding Corporation, Quincy, Massachusetts	Gibbs & Cox	Scrapped 1987	
SS Santa Elena	1933	Grace Line	Federal Shipbuilding and Dry Dock Company Kearny, NJ	Gibbs & Cox	Torpedoed & Sank 1943	
SS Washington	1933	United States Lines	New York Shipbuilding of Camden, New Jersey		Scrapped 1965	Originally ordered for the Transatlantic Steamship Company
1940s
SS America	1940	United States Lines	Newport News Shipbuilding and Drydock Company in Newport News, Virginia	Gibbs & Cox	Wrecked in Canary Islands 1994	
SS La Guardia	1944/1948	American Export Lines	Federal Shipbuilding and Dry Dock Company Kearny, NJ, Converted to passenger service at Ingalls Shipyards, Pascagoula, Mississippi 1948		Scrapped in 2005	Converted from USS General W. P. Richardson (AP-118), a troopship that served with the United States Navy in World War II
SS President Cleveland	1947	American President Lines	Bethlehem Shipbuilding Co, Alameda, California		Scrapped in 1974	Originally ordered by the Maritime Commission during World War II, as one of the Admiral-class Type P2-SE2-R1 transport ships, completed instead as passenger ship.
SS President Wilson	1948	American President Lines	Bethlehem Shipbuilding Co, Alameda, California		Scrapped in 1984	Originally ordered by the Maritime Commission (MC hull 687) during World War II, as one of the Admiral W. S. Benson-class Type P2-SE2-R1 transport ships, completed instead as passenger ship.
1950s
SS Independence	February 1951	American Export Lines	Fore River Shipyard, Bethlehem Shipbuilding Corporation, Quincy, Massachusetts	Henry Dreyfuss	Wrecked on way to scrap yard 2011	
SS Constitution	June 1951	American Export Lines	Fore River Shipyard, Bethlehem Shipbuilding Corporation, Quincy, Massachusetts	Henry Dreyfuss	Sank while under tow to shipbreakers, 1997	
SS United States	1952	United States Lines	Newport News Shipbuilding and Drydock Company in Newport News, Virginia	Gibbs & Cox	Sunk as an artificial reef, November 11, 2026	
SS Monterey	1952/1955	Matson Line	Bethlehem Shipbuilding Co, at Sparrow's Point, Maryland		Scrapped 2006	Ordered by the U.S. Maritime Administration as cargo vessel SS Free State Mariner, completed 1952. Converted to passenger ship by Matson Line in 1955.
SS Mariposa	1953/1955	Matson Line	Fore River Shipyard, Bethlehem Shipbuilding Corporation, Quincy, Massachusetts		Burned & Scrapped 1996	Ordered by the U.S. Maritime Administration as cargo vessel SS Pine Tree Mariner, completed 1953. Converted to passenger ship by Matson Line in 1955.
SS Atlantic	1953/1958	American Export Lines	Sun Ship Building & Dry Dock Co., in Chester, Pennsylvania		Scrapped 1996	Built as “Break Bulk Cargo Ship” for the “US Maritime Commission” in 1953 as the Badger Mariner. Converted to passenger ship by American Export Line in 1958.
SS Santa Rosa	June 1958	Grace Line	Newport News Shipbuilding and Drydock Company in Newport News, Virginia	Gibbs & Cox	Scrapped 2012	
SS Santa Paula	October 1958	Grace Line	Newport News Shipbuilding and Drydock Company in Newport News, Virginia	Gibbs & Cox	Bombed as Hotel ship 1990, Scrapped 2002	
SS Brasil	September 1958	Moore-McCormack Lines	Ingalls Shipyards, Pascagoula, Mississippi		Scrapped 2004	
SS Argentina	December 1958	Moore-McCormack Lines	Ingalls Shipyards, Pascagoula, Mississippi		Scrapped 2005	Last deep water passenger liner to be completed in the United States
2000s
Pride of America	2005	American Classic Voyages/NCL America	Ingalls Shipyards, Pascagoula, Mississippi & Lloyd Werft, Bremerhaven, Germany		In Service	Ordered for American Classic Voyages

== Bibliography ==
- Harnack, Edwin P (1938) [1903]. All About Ships & Shipping (7th ed.). London: Faber and Faber. p. 549.
