= Pride of America =

Cruise ship

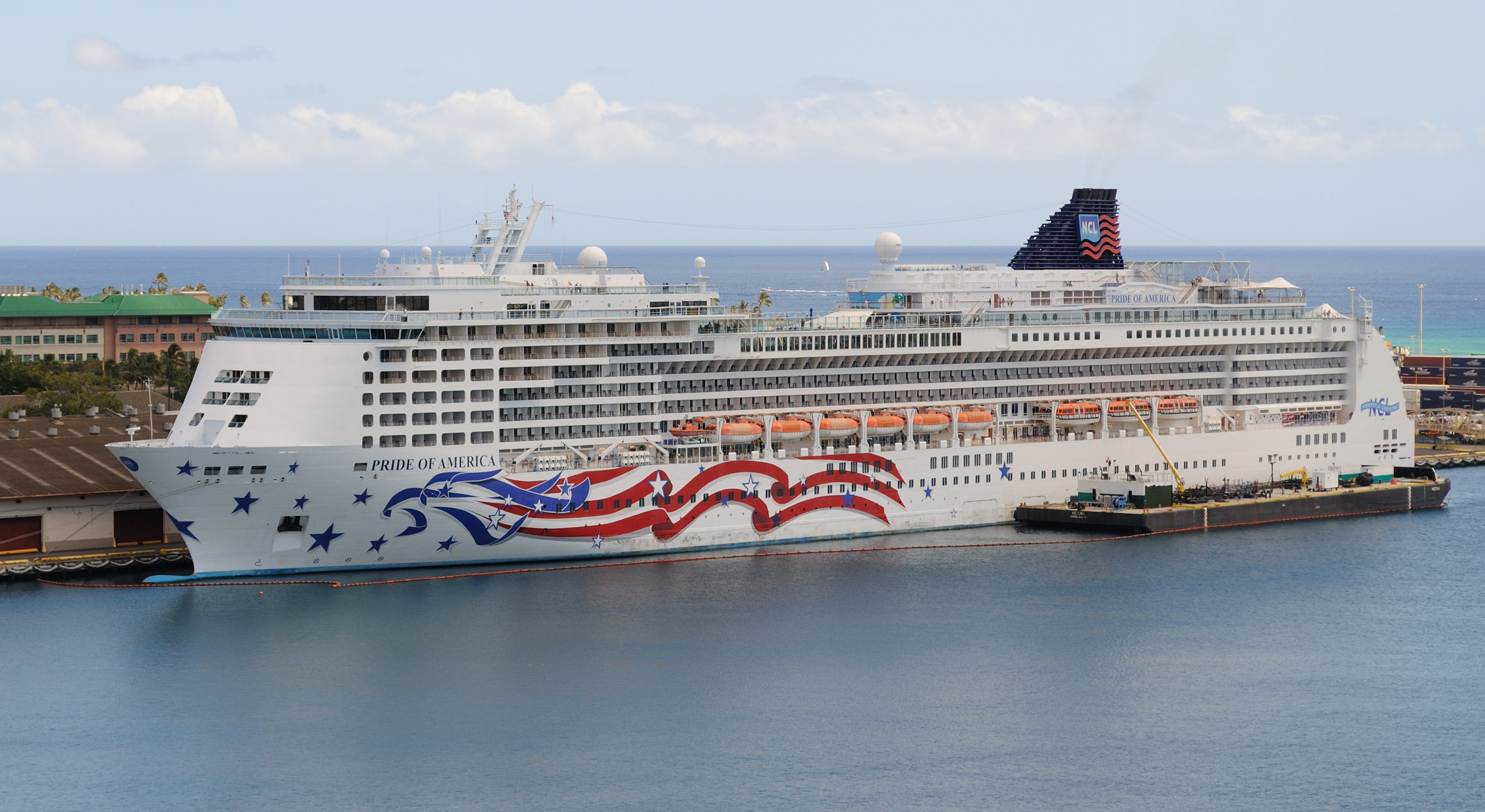
- Pride of America docked in Honolulu, 2010

History

United States
- Name: Pride of America
- Owner: Pride of America Ship Holding Inc. (NCL America)
- Operator: NCL America
- Port of registry: Honolulu, United States
- Ordered: October 6, 1998
- Builder: Litton-Ingalls, Pascagoula, Mississippi (hull); Lloyd Werft, Bremerhaven, Germany (outfitting)
- Yard number: 7671 (Litton-Ingalls); "Project America" (Lloyd Werft)
- Laid down: October 10, 2000
- Launched: September 16, 2002
- Sponsored by: Elaine Chao
- Christened: June 17, 2005
- Completed: June 7, 2005
- In service: 2005–present
- Identification: IMO number: 9209221; Call sign: WNBE; MMSI number: 366994450
- Status: In service

General characteristics (as designed)
- Tonnage: 80,439 GT
- Length: 850 ft (260 m)
- Height: 61 m (200 ft)
- Capacity: 2,500 passengers
- Notes: Purchased by NCL in 2001 as an unfinished vessel following the bankruptcy of American Classic Voyages.

General characteristics (as built)
- Tonnage: 80,439 GT; 50,632 NT; 8,260 DWT
- Length: 921 ft (280.6 m) (overall); 845 ft (257.6 m) (between perpendiculars)
- Beam: 106 ft (32.2 m)
- Height: 61 m (200 ft)
- Draught: 26.2 ft (8.0 m)
- Depth: 65.8 ft (20.07 m)
- Decks: 15
- Installed power: 6 × Wärtsilä 8L46C (6 × 8,400 kW)
- Propulsion: Two Rolls-Royce Mermaid pods (2 × 12.5 MW); Three Rolls-Royce bow thrusters
- Speed: 22.2 knots (41.1 km/h; 25.5 mph)
- Capacity: 2,186 passengers
- Crew: 927

MS Pride of America is a cruise ship operated by NCL America, a division of Norwegian Cruise Lines, to sail itineraries in the Hawaiian Islands. Construction of the ship began in 2000 in the United States as part of a plan for a U.S.-built and U.S.-flagged cruise ship under Project America, but the project failed and she was eventually purchased by Norwegian Cruise Lines and completed in Germany. She was inaugurated in 2005, and was the first new U.S. flagged, U.S.-built (aside from the outfitting) deep water passenger ship in nearly fifty years since the SS Argentina of 1958.

== Construction and design ==
For much of her early build history, Pride of America was known as Project America 1; the first of a pair of 70,000-gross ton cruise ships to be built with heavy federal subsidies. Project America was intended as a means of improving the competitiveness of U.S. shipyards in constructing merchant ships, as well as creating the first U.S.-registered passenger ships of any real size in decades.

The ship was intended to primarily operate in the Hawaiian islands under the revived name of United States Line, and replace the temporary MS Patriot and American Hawaii Cruises aging SS Independence, both American Classic Voyages subsidiary brands. A letter of intent was signed on October 6, 1998, with Litton-Ingalls Shipbuilding in Pascagoula, Mississippi to construct two passenger ships for Hawaii inter-island service with options to build up to four additional vessels. The keel was laid down for Project America 1 at the Pascagoula, Mississippi shipyard in October 2000. The ship was to feature a four-deck-high atrium, a 1,060-seat dining room, an 840-seat theater, a 590-seat cabaret lounge, and a "uniquely Hawaiian" outdoor performance stage, with interiors by designer John McNeece and his company.

The Project America program collapsed in 2001. American Classic Voyages, the parent company, filed for bankruptcy in October 2001. Work on the ship would be suspended on October 25, 2001, after the United States Maritime Administration decided to cease all funding for the vessels' construction, leaving the shipyard no choice but to stop production. The ship was 40 percent complete, and 55 percent erected, with 91 percent of the material having already been purchased.

In August 2002, Norwegian Cruise Line Ltd acquired the 40 percent completed hull, along with all the materials and equipment for the Project America vessels. The hull was towed from Litton-Ingalls Shipbuilding to the Lloyd Werft Shipyard in Bremerhaven, Germany for completion as Pride of America for their newly launched NCL America division. In the process, the ship was lengthened from 850 feet (260 m) to 920 feet (280 m), increasing the gross tonnage from 72,000 to more than 80,000.

Under NCL America, the ship was initially slated for completion in 2004, but the delivery date was pushed back to 2005 after a major storm hit the Lloyd Werft shipyard in January 2004 that caused considerable damage to the vessel causing her to sink at her berth. Damage assessments reveal that the ship had suffered no damage to the hull, although extensive work was required to repair and replace equipment and interior fixtures, which were submerged for more than a month. The delay caused Norwegian Cruise Line to reshuffle its fleet, and move the Norwegian Sky to the NCL America brand, renaming it Pride of Aloha, and takeover the Pride of America's original 2004 itineraries.

Pride of America was repaired, and completed sea trials in May 2005. In June 2005, it left Lloyd Werft Shipyard in Germany, passing the retiring fleet mate SS Norway (which had been used to house workers for Pride of America) and sailed for New York City for its christening.

== Service history ==
The ship was christened at the Manhattan Cruise Terminal on June 17, 2005, by then-United States Secretary of Labor Elaine Chao who released the traditional bottle against the ship's hull. The naming ceremony was significant as the first new U.S.-flagged cruise ship in nearly fifty years, and would fly the American flag donated from the U.S. Capitol Building on its inaugural voyage.

The Pride of America's pre maiden voyage was an East Coast publicity cruise June 18–24, 2005, with Live with Regis and Kelly broadcasting their morning show from on board the ship. A special platform was built on top of the sports court for Regis and Kelly's morning desk. The voyage sailed from New York City, north to Boston, then headed south for stops in Philadelphia, Norfolk and ending in Miami.

The Pride of America continued its maiden voyage sailing through the Panama Canal, up to San Francisco and then over to Honolulu, where the ship joined its fleet mate, the Pride of Aloha. The ship was assigned to a weekly itinerary around the Hawaiian Islands with roundtrip cruises from Honolulu, and stopping at Kahului, Hilo, Kailua Kona and Nawiliwili.

Pride of America entered a 14-day, $30 million dry dock on 23 March 2013 in Honolulu, Hawaii. The ship's renovations including the addition of 24 ultra-luxurious suites (replacing the former top deck conference center and observation deck); four Studio staterooms and four inside staterooms; a Brazilian-style steakhouse; ship wide wireless internet connectivity; new carpeting throughout; flat screen televisions in all staterooms; updated décor; upgrades to the fitness center; new directional signage; renovations to the gift shop, photo gallery and art gallery.

Pride of America entered a 24-day dry dock period in February 2016, at the BAE Systems San Francisco Ship Repair facility. Normally, the ship uses facilities in Pearl Harbor, but these were already fully booked.

During the COVID-19 pandemic on cruise ships, the Hawaii Department of Transportation reported on 8 April 2020 that six crew members of Pride of America had tested positive for COVID-19. Two of the crew members were taken to a hospital for treatment, while the other patients were isolated on board the ship. Another positive case was later announced, bringing the total number of cases to seven.

Following the suspension of cruise operations to mitigate the effect of the COVID-19 pandemic, Pride of America did not carry passengers after 14 March 2020, and docked at Honolulu Harbor, her homeport, with a complement of roughly 500 crew members. This number of crew was later reduced to approximately 140, most of whom are the professional mariners needed to keep the ship operational. By June 2021 she was dry docked at Vigor Industrial in Portland, Oregon with about 200 crew members. In August, 2021, Norwegian Cruise Lines said that the ship would resume service in January, 2022. The first post-pandemic cruise departed on April 9, 2022.

== U.S. flagged cruise ship ==
A special exemption on the part of the U.S. government allowed the modified vessel and the mostly German-built Pride of Hawaii to attain U.S. registry since they had parts that were built in the United States (Pride of Aloha was also given an exemption, despite being completely built in Germany). Since Pride of America is registered in the U.S., she is subject to U.S. labor laws and is staffed by a mostly U.S. crew. This is in contrast to most other cruise ships, which are registered in flag of convenience countries and have mainly foreign crews. In addition, Pride of America has no casino on board, because she never leaves U.S. waters. The U.S. registry allows the ship to travel solely between U.S. ports, unlike all other foreign-flagged cruise ships that must abide by the Passenger Vessel Services Act of 1886.

The professional Deck and Engine officers on the Pride of America are represented by the Marine Engineers' Beneficial Association, and the M.E.B.A.'s president since 2021, Adam Vokac, had sailed as First assistant engineer on board.

== See also ==
- List of American built passenger ships
- List of current U.S. flagged cruise ships
