= MS Marella Spirit =

Ship built in 1983

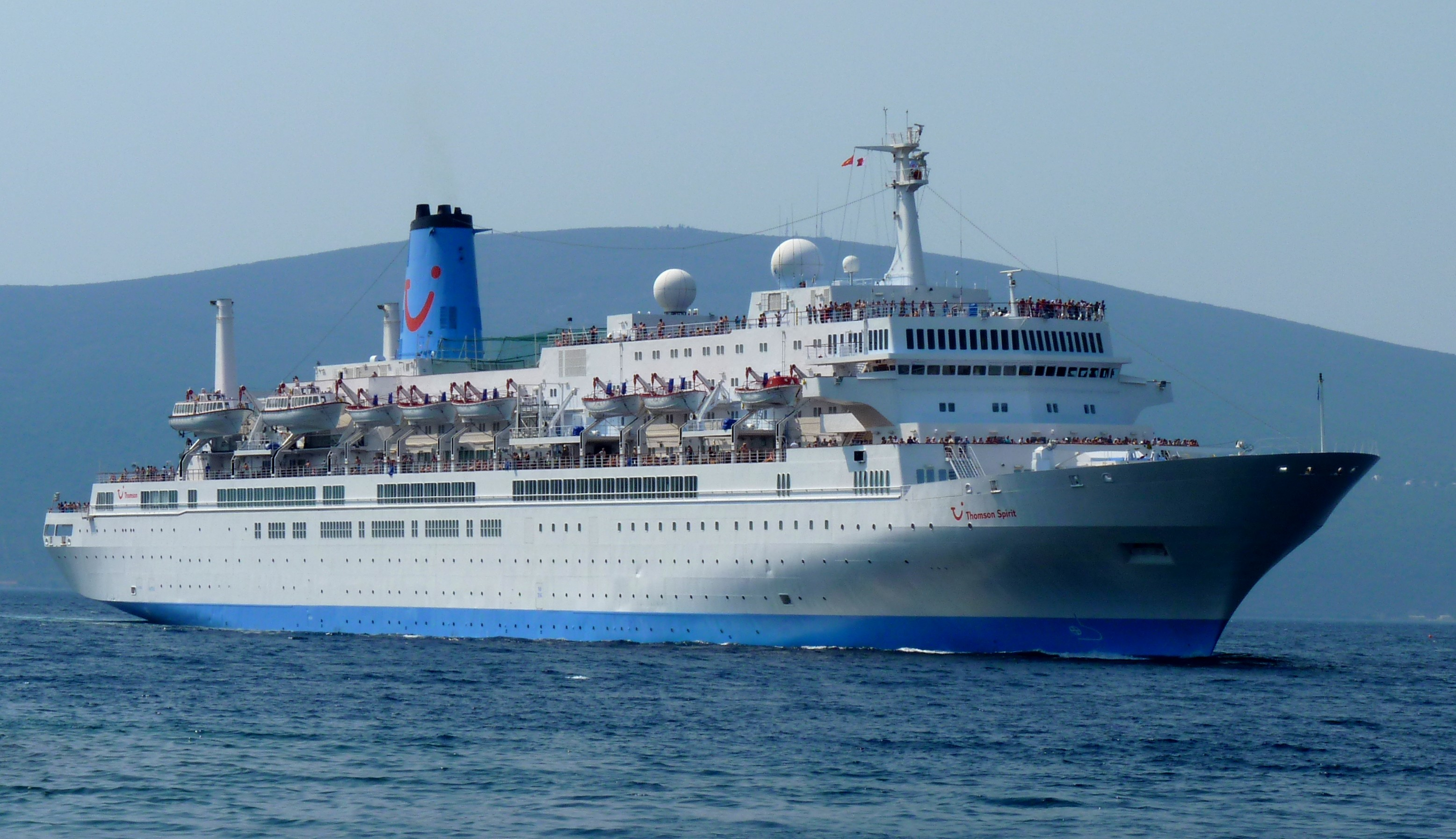
- Thomson Spirit in the Bay of Kotor

History
- Name: 1984–2000: Nieuw Amsterdam; 2000–2002: Patriot; 2002: Nieuw Amsterdam; 2002–2003: Spirit; 2003–2018: Thomson Spirit; 2018: Marella Spirit; 2018: Mare S; 2018: La Spirit
- Owner: 1984–2000: Holland America Line; 2000–2001: American Classic Voyages; 2002-2018: Holland America Line
- Operator: 1989–2000: Holland America Line; 2000–2001: American Classic Voyages; 2001–2003: Laid up; 2003–2017: Thomson Cruises; 2017–2018: Marella Cruises
- Port of registry: 1983–1984: Willemstad, Netherlands Antilles; 1984–1997: St. Maarten, Netherlands Antilles; 1997–2000: Rotterdam, Netherlands; 2000–2002: Honolulu, United States; 2002–2005: Nassau, Bahamas; 2005–2010: Limassol, Cyprus; 2010–2018: Valletta, Malta; 2018: Palau
- Builder: Chantiers de l'Atlantique, Saint Nazaire, France
- Cost: $150 million
- Yard number: V27
- Launched: 20 August 1982
- Christened: by HRH Princess Margriet
- Completed: 1983
- Acquired: July 1983
- Maiden voyage: 1983
- In service: July 1983
- Out of service: 2018
- Identification: IMO number: 8024014
- Fate: Scrapped at Alang, India in 2018

General characteristics (as Thomson Spirit)
- Type: cruise ship
- Tonnage: 33,930 GT
- Length: 214.66 m (704 ft 3 in)
- Beam: 27.26 m (89 ft 5 in)
- Draught: 7.52 m (24 ft 8 in)
- Decks: 10
- Installed power: 2 × Sulzer RLB66 diesel engines, combined 22,400 kW
- Propulsion: 2 propellers
- Speed: 21 knots (38.89 km/h; 24.17 mph)
- Capacity: 1,350 in 627 staterooms
- Crew: 520

MS Marella Spirit was a cruise ship owned by Holland America Line and operated under charter by the United Kingdom-based Marella Cruises. She was built in 1983 at the Chantiers de l'Atlantique shipyard in France for Holland America Line as MS Nieuw Amsterdam. Between 2000 and 2001 she sailed for United States Lines, a subsidiary of American Classic Voyages, as MS Patriot. In 2002 she returned under Holland America Line ownership and reverted to the name Nieuw Amsterdam, but was not used in active service. During the same year she was chartered to Louis Cruise Lines, who in turn sub-chartered the ship to Thomson Cruises, with whom she entered service under MS Thomson Spirit in 2003.

== Concept and construction ==
The Nieuw Amsterdam was the first in a pair of identical cruise ships built by Chantiers de l'Atlantique at St. Nazaire, France for the Holland America Line (HAL) with North-American cruising in mind. Her sister ship is now the MS Thomson Celebration. She was launched from drydock on 20 August 1982. While in final stages of construction a fire destroyed the ship's main switchboard on 24 June 1983, which delayed her delivery to her owners by three weeks. She was delivered to HAL in July 1983.

== Service history ==
=== 1983–2000: MS Nieuw Amsterdam ===
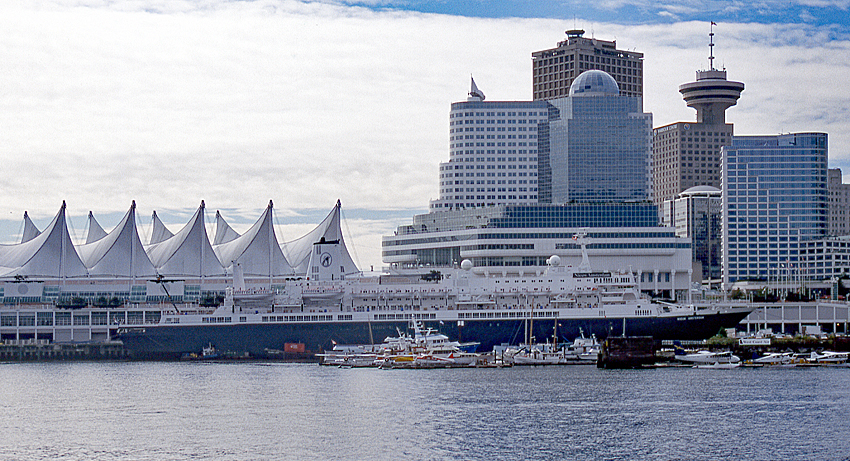
Nieuw Amsterdam at Vancouver in 1999

The Nieuw Amsterdam entered service with Holland America Line in July 1983, doing a transatlantic crossing from Le Havre to New York. Following her maiden voyage she was used for cruising in the Caribbean during the Northern Hemisphere winter seasons and cruises out of Vancouver to Alaska during the summer seasons. In April 1984 she was joined in service by her sister MS Noordam (1984), which operated similar itineraries. As the HAL fleet grew from the late 1980s onwards, the Nieuw Amsterdam's itineraries widened to various destination around the world. In 1989 the Holland America Line was acquired by the Carnival Corporation, but HAL remained a separate entity.

In late 1999 the Nieuw Amsterdam was sold to American Classic Voyages, with delivery planned for October 2000. The ship finished her final cruise with HAL in Vancouver on 24 August 2000. Subsequently, she sailed without passengers to Sydney, where she was moored as a hotel ship for the duration of the 2000 Summer Olympics. On 2 October 2000 the ship left Sydney for San Francisco where she was handed over to her new owners.

=== 2000–2002: MS Patriot ===
On 18 October 2000 the Nieuw Amsterdam was taken over by America Classic Cruises in San Francisco and renamed MS Patriot. American Classic Cruises had decided to revive the historic United States Lines brand for cruises operated out of Honolulu, and the Patriot was to be the first ship of this new venture. Unusual for a ship built outside the United States, the Patriot was registered in Honolulu. By terms of the Passenger Services Act, only ships built in the United States may be registered in the United States, and only ships registered in the United States may be used in intra-United States passenger traffic. American Classic Cruises planned to have two brand-new ships (codenamed "Project America") built for United States Lines at the Ingalls Shipbuilding yards in Mississippi. This scheme was given generous support by the United States government with hopes that the project would help restart passenger ship construction in the United States. As a temporary measure United States Lines was allowed to register the Patriot in a US port to begin operations before completion of the Project America vessels, thereby allowing her to cruise around the Hawaiian Islands without the need to make calls at ports outside the US. The Patriot was the first oceangoing passenger ship since 1958 to enter service under the United States flag.

Following a refit the ship left San Francisco on her first cruise with her new owners on 2 December 2000, arriving in Honolulu on 8 December and commencing normal service around the Hawaiian Islands the same day. The United States Lines cruise venture proved to be short-lived. The 11 September 2001 terrorist attacks caused a slump in US tourism and on 18 October 2001 American Classic Cruises declared bankruptcy due to massive debts owed to the US government. Following the bankruptcy of her owners the Patriot was laid up in Honolulu.

=== 2002–2018: Nieuw Amsterdam/Spirit/Thomson Spirit/Spirit/Marella Spirit ===
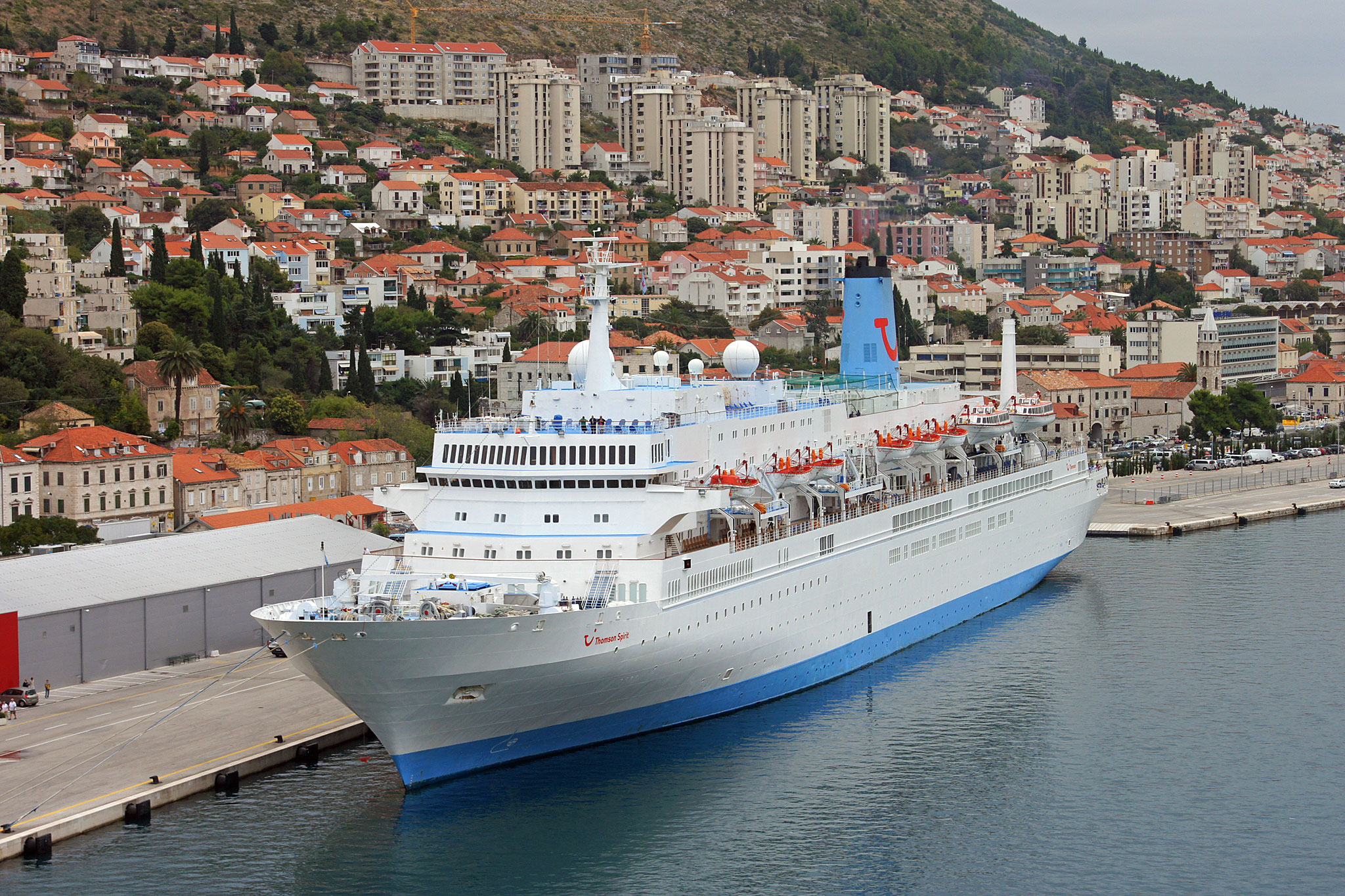
Thomson Spirit in Dubrovnik, Croatia

Holland America Line repurchased their old ship on 27 January 2002 and she reverted to her old name Nieuw Amsterdam. She did not re-enter service with HAL, but remained laid up, first in Honolulu and later in Charleston, South Carolina. In May 2002 the Nieuw Amsterdam was chartered to the Cyprus-based Louis Cruise Lines, renamed MS Spirit and sailed to Perama, Greece for a refit.

Following a lengthy refit at Perama, Louis Cruise Lines sub-chartered the Spirit to Thomson Cruises from 3 May 2003 onwards. Upon entering service with Thomson the ship's name was amended into MS Thomson Spirit. She was initially used on Western Mediterranean cruises out of Palma, Majorca and continued making cruises on the Mediterranean during the northern hemisphere summer seasons and cruises on the Red Sea during the winter seasons. Throughout summer 2012, the Thomson Spirit operated a variety of cruises to northern Europe from Harwich and Newcastle (North Shields), England. Throughout autumn 2012, she sailed the Western Mediterranean until she was laid up at Limassol, Cyprus for the winter, and restarted sailing March 2013. From 2014 certain cruises in the spring would operate from Liverpool.

=== 2014 Olympics ===
During the 2014 Winter Olympics in Sochi, Russia, she was used as a floating hotel. Alongside her on hotel duty were the Grand Holiday and Louis Olympia.

=== Rebranding and retirement ===
Following the announcement in October 2017, that Thomson Cruises would be renamed Marella Cruises, TUI Group also announced that Thomson Spirit would have her charter increased by year and adopt the Marella name and the ship became Marella Spirit. In October 2018 the charter for the Marella Spirit concluded and she was replaced by the Marella Explorer. Both Celestyal Cruises and Holland America Line had little interest in keeping the Marella Spirit in service, and she was sold for scrapping. She was renamed Mare S for her last voyage from Piraeus to Alang. She was beached for scrapping on 5 December 2018.
