= Fletcher Hale =

American politician (1883–1931)

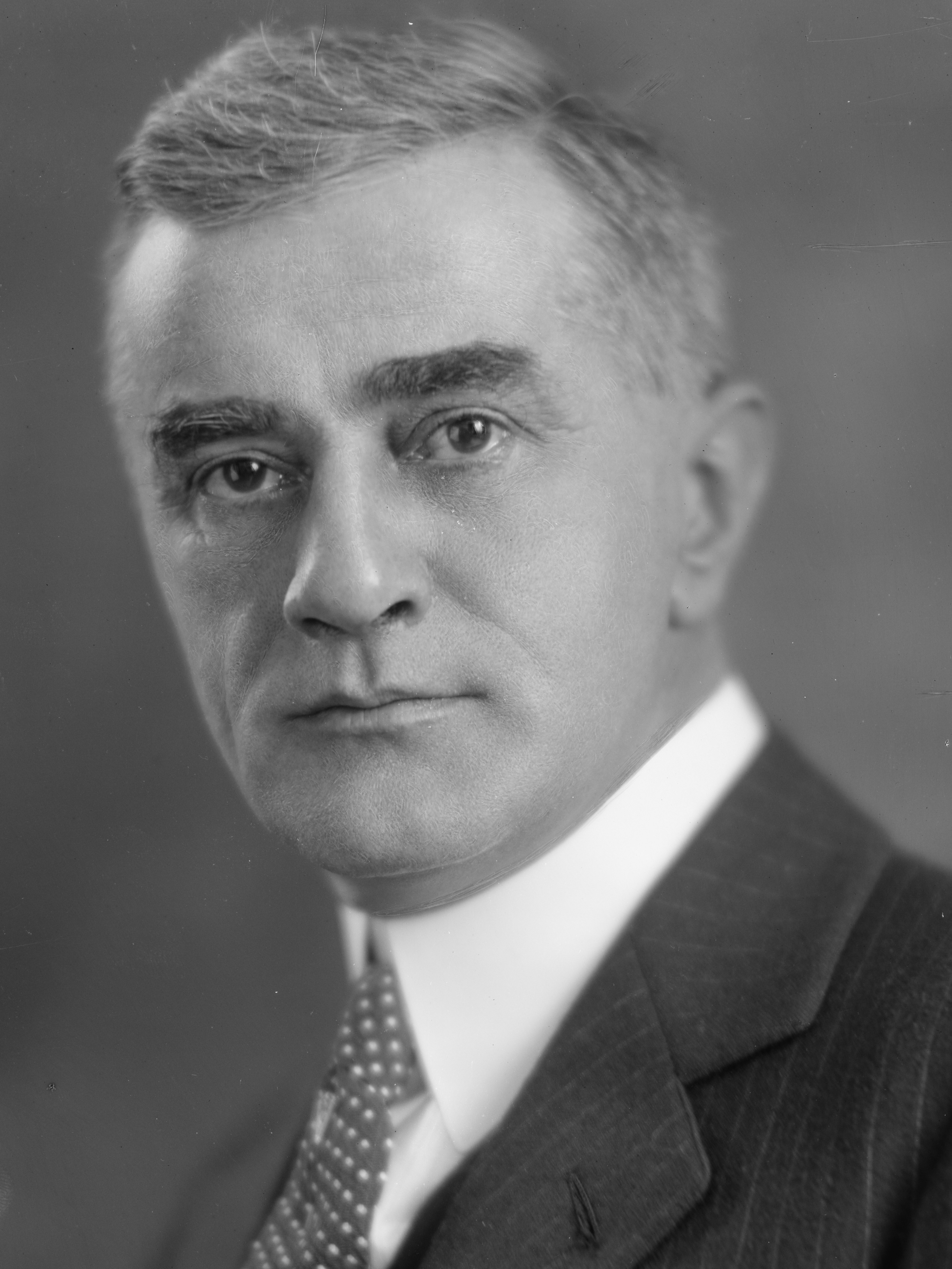

Member of the U.S. House of Representatives from New Hampshire's 1st district
- In office March 4, 1925 – October 22, 1931
- Preceded by: William Nathaniel Rogers
- Succeeded by: William Nathaniel Rogers

Personal details
- Born: January 22, 1883 Portland, Maine, USA
- Died: October 22, 1931 (aged 48) Brooklyn Naval Hospital; Brooklyn, New York, USA
- Resting place: Union Cemetery; Laconia, New Hampshire
- Party: Republican
- Spouse: Alice Norma Armstrong Hale (m. 1913)
- Children: 2
- Education: Dartmouth College
- Occupation: Lawyer

Fletcher Hale (January 22, 1883 – October 22, 1931) was an American politician and a United States representative from New Hampshire.

== Early life ==
Born in Portland, Maine, on January 22, 1883, Hale was the son of Frederick Fletcher Hale and Adelaide L. (MacLellan) Hale. His family moved to Boston, where Hale was educated in the public schools and graduated from The English High School in 1901. He then attended Dartmouth College, from which he graduated in 1905. He studied law at Harvard Law School and with attorney Albert S. Batchellor and was admitted to the bar in 1908. He began to practice in Littleton, then moved to Laconia in 1912 and continued to practice.

== Career ==
Hale served as city solicitor of Laconia in 1915 and as solicitor for Belknap County from 1915 to 1920. Hale was member of the Laconia board of education from 1916 to 1925 and was chairman 1918–1925. He was a delegate to the New Hampshire constitutional convention in 1918 and a member and secretary of the New Hampshire Tax Commission from 1920 to 1925.

He was elected as a Republican to the Sixty-ninth congress and reelected to the three succeeding Congresses. He served as congressman from the state of New Hampshire from March 4, 1925, until his death.

== Death ==
Hale was taken ill while returning to the United States from London aboard the SS President Harding after attending an Inter-Parliamentary Union conference in Bucharest. He was removed from the ship when it arrived on October 22, 1931, and taken to the Brooklyn Naval Hospital. He was diagnosed with pneumonia and died a few hours later of a cerebral embolism. He was interred at Union Cemetery, Laconia, New Hampshire.

== Family ==
He married Alice N. Armstrong on March 29, 1913. They were the parents of two sons, Fletcher (1915–1998), a captain in the U.S. Navy, and Robert Armstrong (1918–1945), a captain and B-26 Marauder pilot in the United States Army Air Forces during World War II who died after his plane was shot down near Frankfurt.

== See also ==
- List of members of the United States Congress who died in office (1900–1949)

U.S. House of Representatives
Preceded by William Nathaniel Rogers	Member of the U.S. House of Representatives from New Hampshire's 1st congressional district 1925–1931	Succeeded by William Nathaniel Rogers
