= 1936 United States Senate election in New Hampshire =

- November 3, 1936
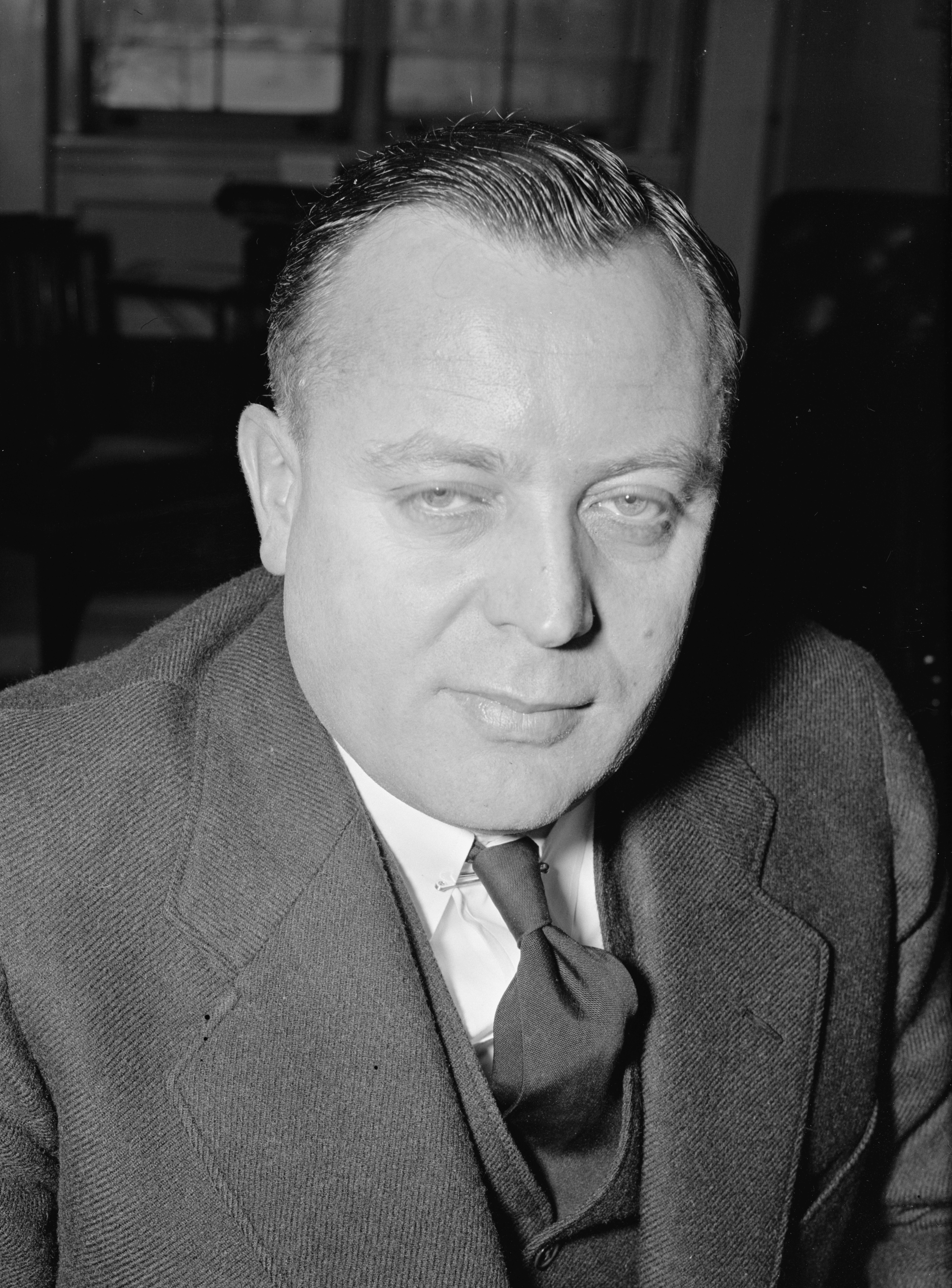

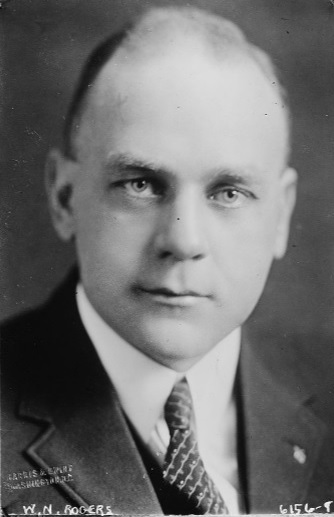
Nominee	Styles Bridges	William N. Rogers
Party	Republican	Democratic
Popular vote	107,923	99,195
Percentage	51.86%	47.67%
- Bridges: 50–60% 60–70% 70–80% 80–90% >90% Rogers: 50–60% 60–70% 70–80% 80–90%
U.S. senator before election
Henry W. Keyes
Republican
Elected U.S. Senator
Styles Bridges
Republican

The 1936 United States Senate election in New Hampshire took place on November 3, 1936. Incumbent Republican Senator Henry W. Keyes did not run for re-election.

Governor of New Hampshire Styles Bridges won the open election to succeed him, defeating former Senator George H. Moses in the Republican primary and Democratic U.S. Representative William N. Rogers in the general election. Bridges would win four more elections to the seat; this election was the closest of his career.

Primary elections were held on September 15, 1936.

== Republican primary ==
=== Candidates ===
- Styles Bridges, incumbent Governor of New Hampshire
- William J. Callahan
- George H. Moses, former U.S. Senator (1918–1933)

=== Results ===
1936 Republican U.S. Senate primary
Party	Candidate	Votes	%
Republican	Styles Bridges	45,463	56.05%
Republican	George H. Moses	32,108	39.58%
Republican	William J. Callahan	3,547	4.37%
Total votes		40,085	100.00%

== Democratic primary ==
=== Candidates ===
- William N. Rogers, U.S. Representative from Wakefield

=== Results ===
1936 Democratic U.S. Senate primary
Party	Candidate	Votes	%
Democratic	William N. Rogers	24,234	100.00%
Total votes		24,234	100.00%

== General election ==
=== Candidates ===
- Styles Bridges, incumbent Governor of New Hampshire (Republican)
- Stearns Morse, Dartmouth College professor of English (Farmer-Labor)
- William N. Rogers, U.S. Representative from Wakefield (Democratic)

=== Results ===
1936 U.S. Senate election in New Hampshire
Party	Candidate	Votes	%	±%
Republican	Styles Bridges	107,923	51.86%	▼6.02
Democratic	William N. Rogers	99,195	47.67%	▲5.77
Farmer–Labor	Stearns Morse	989	0.48%	N/A
Total votes		162,257	100.00%	
Republican hold				

== See also ==
- 1936 United States Senate elections
