= William N. Rogers =

American politician

William Nathaniel Rogers
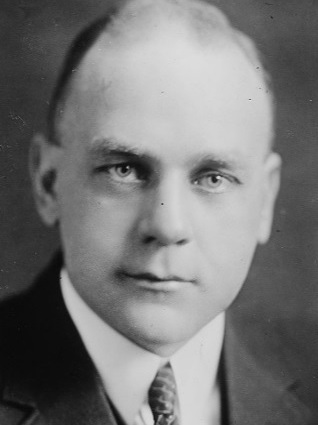

Member of the U.S. House of Representatives from New Hampshire's 1st district
- In office January 5, 1932 – January 3, 1937
- Preceded by: Fletcher Hale
- Succeeded by: Arthur B. Jenks
- In office March 4, 1923 – March 3, 1925
- Preceded by: Sherman Everett Burroughs
- Succeeded by: Fletcher Hale

Member of the New Hampshire House of Representatives
- In office 1917; 1919; 1921

Personal details
- Born: January 10, 1892 Sanbornville, New Hampshire
- Died: September 25, 1945 (aged 53) Wolfeboro, New Hampshire
- Party: Democratic

William Nathaniel Rogers (January 10, 1892 – September 25, 1945) was a U.S. representative from New Hampshire.

Born in Sanbornville, New Hampshire, Rogers attended the public schools, Brewster Free Academy in Wolfeboro, and Dartmouth College in Hanover. He was graduated from the law department of the University of Maine at Orono in 1916. He was admitted to the bar the same year and practiced in Sanbornville and Rochester, New Hampshire. He served as member of the New Hampshire House of Representatives in 1917, 1919, and 1921.

Rogers was elected as a Democrat to the Sixty-eighth Congress (March 4, 1923 – March 3, 1925). He was an unsuccessful candidate for reelection in 1924 to the Sixty-ninth Congress. He resumed the practice of his profession in Concord, New Hampshire. He was Moderator of the town of Wakefield, New Hampshire from 1928 to 1945.

Rogers was elected January 5, 1932, to fill the vacancy in the Seventy-second Congress caused by the death of Fletcher Hale. He was reelected to the Seventy-third and Seventy-fourth Congresses and served from January 5, 1932, to January 3, 1937. He was not a candidate for renomination, but was an unsuccessful candidate for election to the United States Senate in 1936.

He resumed the practice of law in Concord until 1943, when he moved to Sanbornville, and continued practice until his death in Wolfeboro, September 25, 1945. He was interred in Lovell Lake Cemetery, Sanbornville.

Party political offices
Preceded by Albert W. Noone	Democratic nominee for U.S. Senator from New Hampshire (Class 2); 1936	Succeeded by Francis P. Murphy
U.S. House of Representatives
Preceded by Sherman Everett Burroughs	U.S. Representative for the 1st district of New Hampshire; March 4, 1923–March 3, 1925	Succeeded by Fletcher Hale
Preceded by Fletcher Hale	U.S. Representative for the 1st district of New Hampshire; January 5, 1932–January 3, 1937	Succeeded by Arthur B. Jenks
