= MS Thomson Celebration =

Cruise ship operated by Marella Cruises

Thomson Celebration
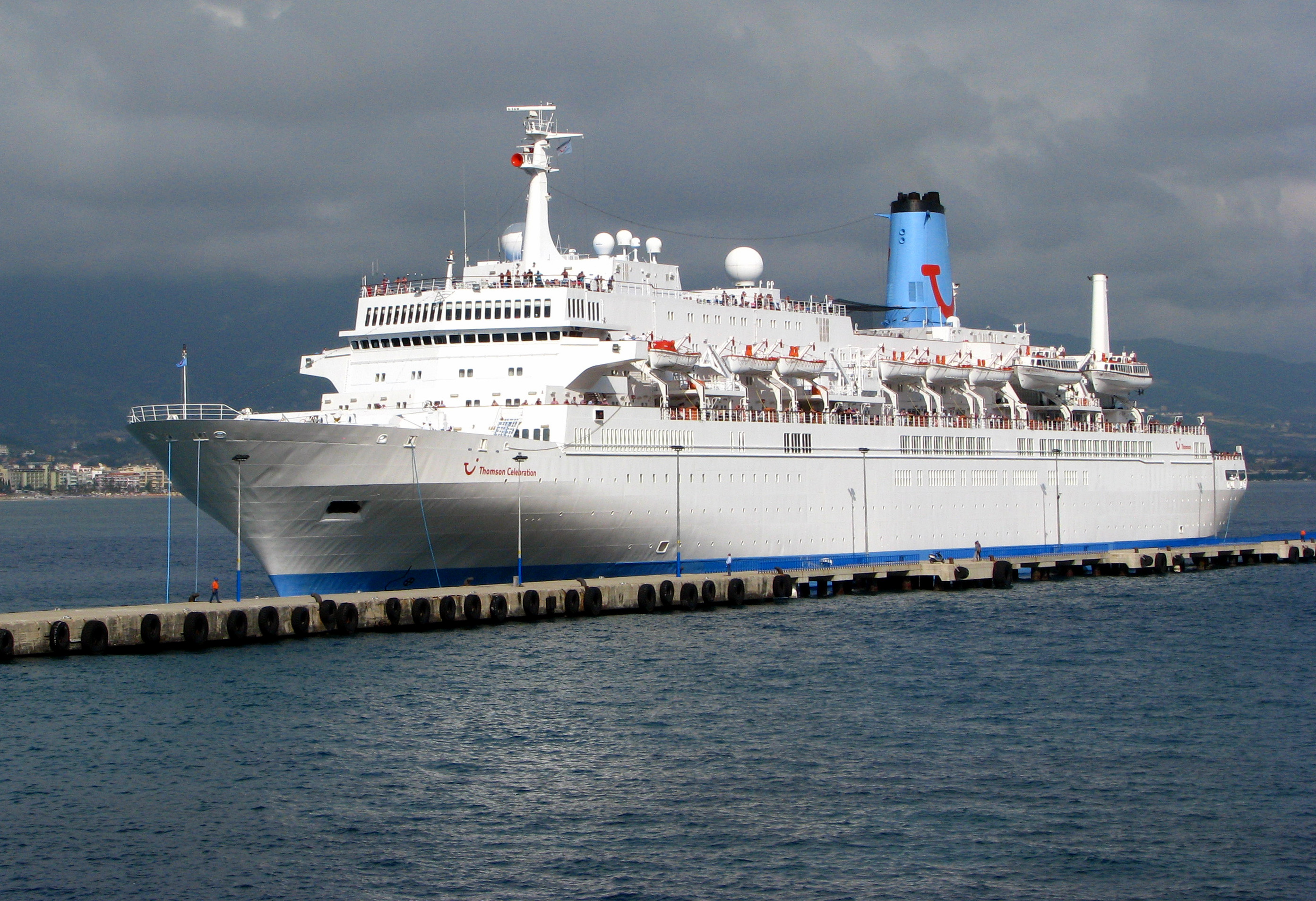
- Thomson Celebration at Alanya, Turkey

History
- Name: 1984–2005: Noordam; 2005–2017: Thomson Celebration; 2017–2020: Marella Celebration; 2020–2022: Mare
- Owner: 1984–2018: Holland America Line; 2018–2020: TUI UK
- Operator: 1984–2005: Holland America Line; 2005–2017: Thomson Cruises; 2017–2020: Marella Cruises
- Port of registry: 1984–1996: Sint Maarten, Netherlands Antilles; 1996–2005: Rotterdam, Netherlands; 2005–2009: Sint Maarten, Netherlands Antilles; 2009–2022: Malta
- Builder: Chantiers de l'Atlantique
- Yard number: X27
- Launched: 21 May 1983
- Sponsored by: Beatrijs van De Wallbake
- Completed: 1984
- In service: 8 April 1984
- Out of service: 2020
- Identification: Call sign: 9HUI9; IMO number: 8027298; MMSI number: 249544000
- Fate: Scrapped in 2022

General characteristics
- Type: Cruise ship
- Tonnage: 33,933 GT; 4,243 DWT
- Length: 214.66 m (704 ft 3 in)
- Beam: 27.26 m (89 ft 5 in)
- Draught: 7.50 m (24 ft 7 in)
- Decks: 9
- Installed power: 2 × Sulzer RLB66 diesels; combined 21,600 kW (29,000 hp)
- Speed: 18 knots (33 km/h; 21 mph) (other sources claim 21 knots (39 km/h; 24 mph))
- Capacity: 1,254 passengers (1,350 maximum)
- Crew: 520

MS Thomson Celebration was a cruise ship owned by TUI UK, and last operated by their United Kingdom-based Marella Cruises. She was built in 1984 by Chantiers de l'Atlantique in Saint-Nazaire, France for Holland America Line (HAL) as MS Noordam. On 29 April 2020, Marella announced that the ship would be retired from the fleet and sold for scrap. The ship beached for scrap at the Aliağa Ship Breaking Yard in 2022.

== History ==
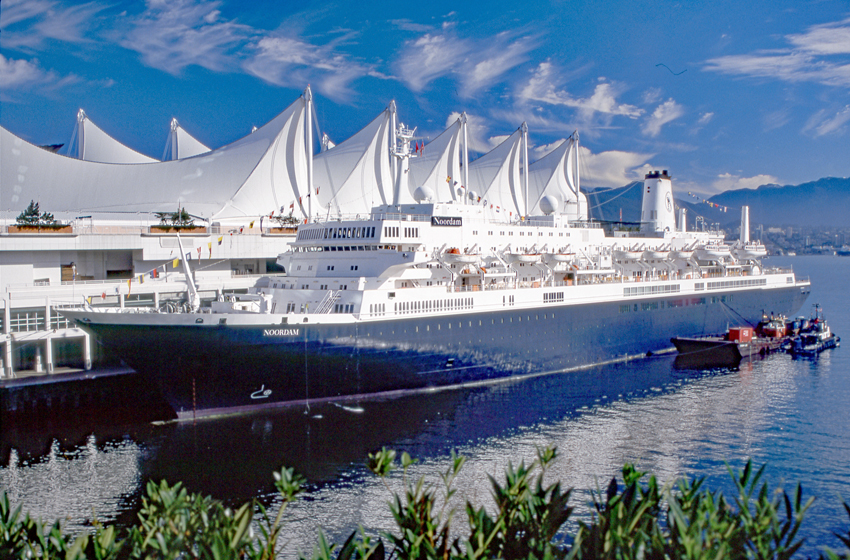
Noordam in Vancouver in 1999

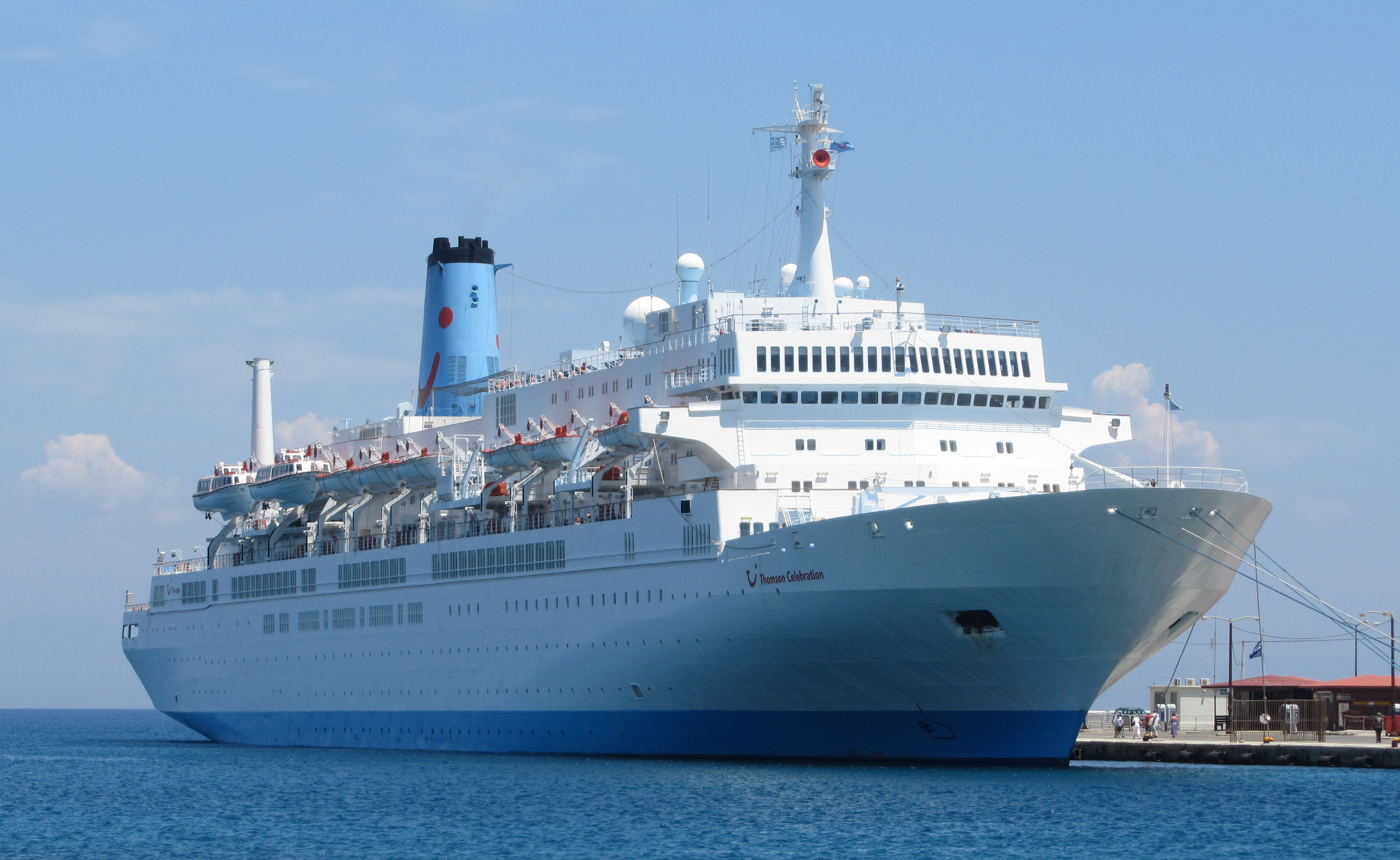
Thomson Celebration in 2010

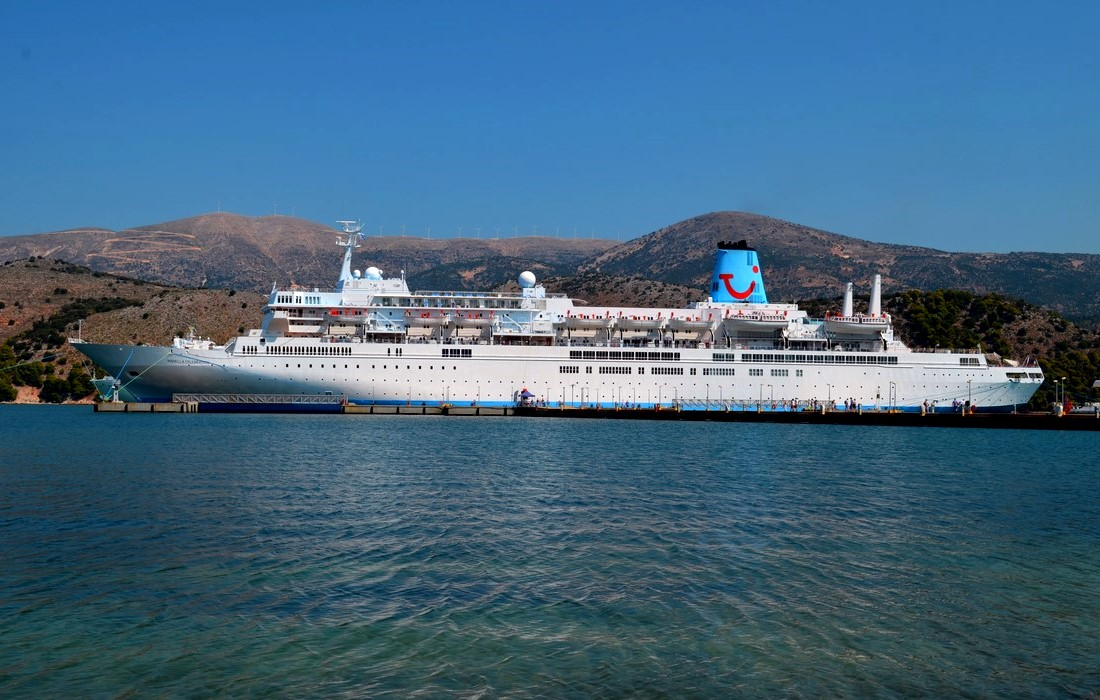
Marella Celebration at Argostoli.

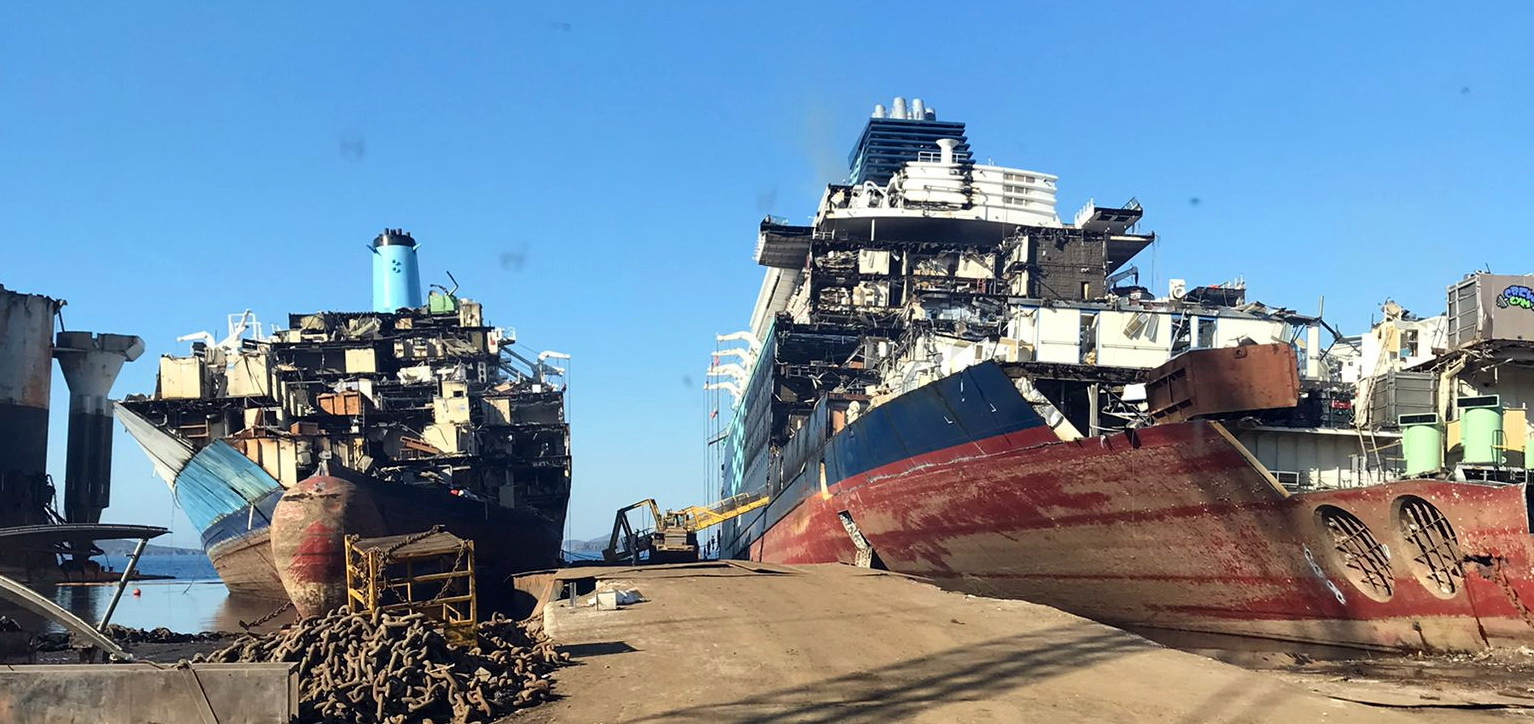
Mare on the left being broken up next to Ori in 2023

Marella Celebration was built by Chantiers de l'Atlantique in 1984 for Holland America Line as Noordam at a cost of $160 million and became the third HAL vessel to bear the name. She was originally furnished with a $1 million art collection, some of which, including a 17th-century Oriental screen, can still be found on board. Her sister ship, Thomson Spirit, also originally operated for HAL as Nieuw Amsterdam.

After Noordam's last sailing with HAL, the ship was taken out of service and chartered to Thomson Cruises and later rechristened as Thomson Celebration.

On 9 October 2017, Thomson Cruises announced to be renamed Marella Cruises. TUI Group renamed Thomson Celebration to Marella Celebration at the end of October 2017.

On 14 September 2022, the ship left Eleusis, towed by the tug Vernicos Sifnos, to Aliağa, Turkey for scrapping.
