= Project America =

US shipbuilding contract

- Artist rendering of The Project America

Class overview
- Builders: Litton Ingalls, Lloyd Werft
- Operators: United States Lines (planned); Norwegian Cruise Line (for modifications & completion)
- Built: 1999-2005
- In service: NCL (2005–)
- Planned: 2
- Completed: 1 (modified post build)
- Canceled: 1
- Active: 1

General characteristics (as designed)
- Tonnage: 72,000 GT
- Length: 840 ft (260 m)
- Capacity: 1,900 Passengers

General characteristics (built as Pride of America)
- Tonnage: 81,000 GT
- Length: 920.6 ft (280.6 m)
- Beam: 105.6 ft (32.2 m)
- Draught: 26 ft (7.9 m)
- Decks: 15
- Capacity: 2,146 passengers
- Crew: 900

Project America was the designation for a contract between American Classic Voyages and the Litton Ingalls Shipyard of Pascagoula, Mississippi. The contract was to build two cruise ships, with a gross tonnage of 72,000 each, with an option for a third vessel. The contract had the initial potential value of $1.4 billion U.S. dollars. The first ordered ship would go on to be completed as the Pride of America.

== History ==
The intention of the project was to revitalise the U.S. passenger cruise shipbuilding industry. These ships were to be the largest cruise ships ever built in the U.S., with the first planned to enter service in early 2003. As points of nostalgia and history, Ingalls delivered the last American-built large passenger ships, Brasil and Argentina, in 1958.

John McNeece and his company were engaged by American Classic Voyages as their consultant architects whose role was to plan and design the interior architecture and design of the leading vessel in the series. Construction began in June 2000 but the bankruptcy of American Classic Voyages in October 2001 halted the project and left only the partially completed hull of the first ship, and parts and supplies for the second.

== Original ship plans ==
The ships were planned to cruise within the Hawaiian Islands and were to represent the state-of-the-art in comfort and luxury. At an estimated 840 feet (260 m) long, each ship was to be approximately 72,000 GT. Each vessel was to feature a four-deck-high atrium, a 1,060-seat dining room, an 840-seat theater, a 590-seat cabaret lounge, and a "uniquely Hawaiian" outdoor performance stage.

Plans called for accommodations for 1,900 passengers which included 950 cabins, 77 percent of which were to be "outside cabins," and 64 percent of which were to have private balconies. The ships were to have 85,850 square feet (7,976 m^{2}) of open deck space, extensive health spa and gymnasium facilities, and 2,100 square feet (200 m^{2}) of conference space. In addition, the upper three decks of the ships were to be designed to "maximize the sense of spaciousness on board, and provide passengers with panoramic views of the Hawaiian Islands and the surrounding Pacific Ocean".

== Eventual completion ==
=== Norwegian Cruise Line's involvement ===
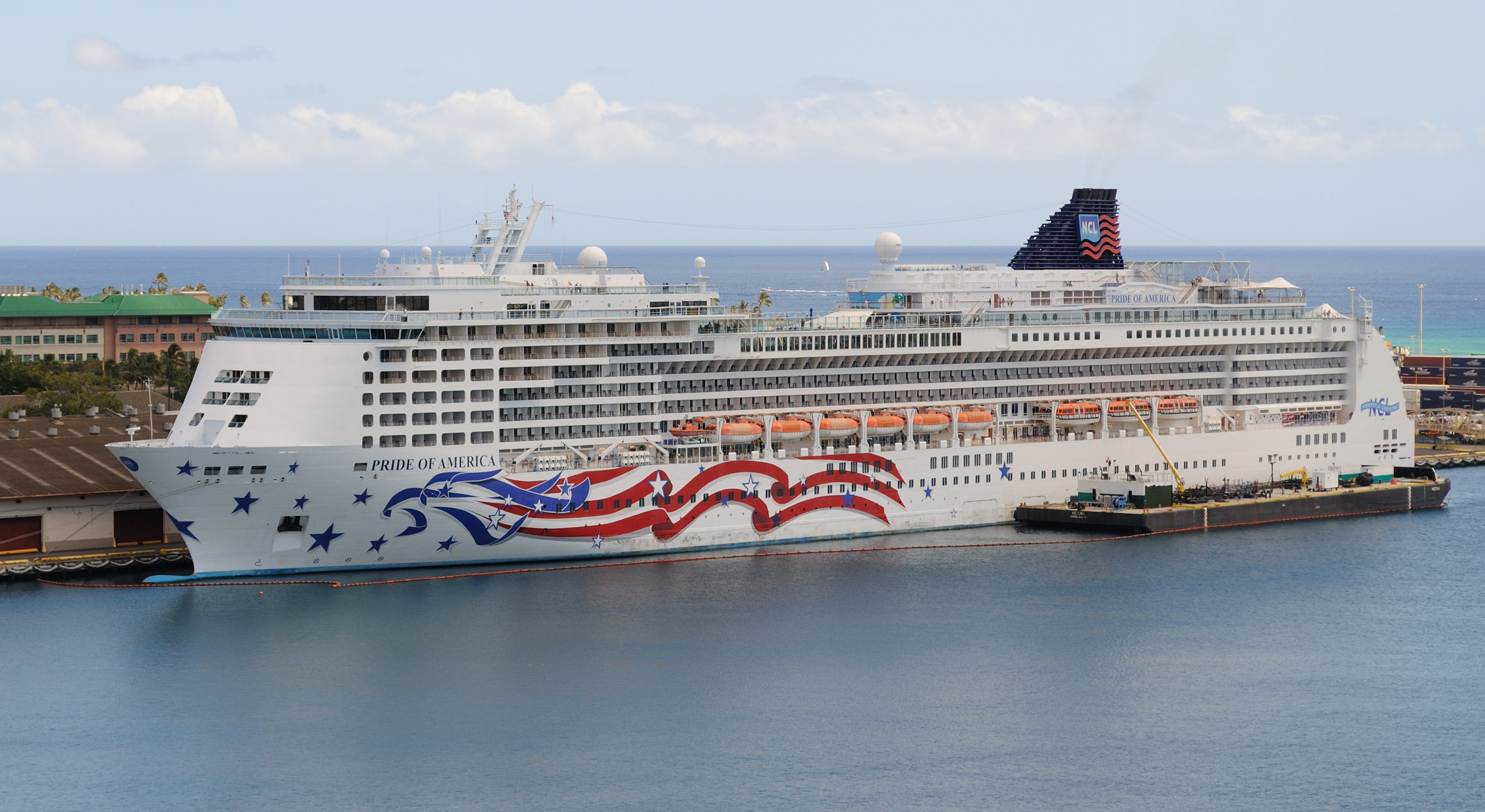
The Pride of America, a derived version of the Project America ships

In late 2002, Norwegian Cruise Line contracted Northrop Grumman Ship Systems, the owner of Ingalls, to buy all of the materials, equipment and work performed on the two Project America vessels. All of the materials were towed to Germany and the first ship was completed at Lloyd Werft Shipyard in Bremerhaven. The ship was lengthened as is now 81,000 GT plus additional exterior and interior changes were made. This ship was named the Pride of America and entered service in 2005.

The materials for the second Project America ship were utilised in the construction of the Pride of Hawaii (now named Norwegian Jade), at Meyer Werft Shipyard in Papenburg. Pride of Hawaii entered service in 2006 and is approximately 12,000 GT larger than Pride of America.

=== Passenger Vessel Services Act ===
In exchange for its purchase of the Project America materials, Norwegian Cruise Line lobbied heavily for an exception to the Passenger Vessel Services Act, which prohibits foreign built ships from operating between U.S. ports without making a foreign stop in between. The exception was granted and three ships (the aforementioned as well as Pride of Aloha), effectively all foreign built, were allowed to fly the U.S. flag. This exception allows Norwegian Cruise Line to have an exclusive right to operate Hawaiian itineraries that do not need to touch a foreign port. A caveat of this exception, however, requires Norwegian Cruise Line to staff these ships with a crew made up of predominantly U.S. citizens.

== Goals ==
Project America was the result of the U.S.-Flag Cruise Ship Pilot Project Statute passed by Congress in 1997, designed to do the following:

- Revitalise the U.S.-flag oceangoing cruise ship fleet
- Create more than 5,000 American jobs
- Help sustain and modernise the U.S. shipbuilding industrial base
- Increase U.S. tax revenues
- Boost Hawaii tourism
- Expand consumers' leisure travel opportunities

== Support ==
The Department of Defense and the U.S. Maritime Administration strongly supported the U.S.-Flag Ship Pilot Project. The project enjoyed great political support from Mississippi's U.S. Senators, Thad Cochran and Trent Lott, as well as U.S. Senator Daniel Inouye of Hawaii.
