= Stearns Morse =

American scholar and politician (1893-1976)

Stearns Morse (1893–1976) was a professor of English and an administrator at Dartmouth College in Hanover, New Hampshire. He served as a member of the faculty at Dartmouth for 37 years (1923–1960). Morse was also a candidate for U.S. Senate who ran on the Farmer-Labor Party ticket in 1937.

== Early life and education ==
Morse was born in Bath, New Hampshire, on a farm developed by his grandfather in the 18th century. After beginning his schooling at a one-room schoolhouse in Bath, Morse completed his high school education in Lawrence, Massachusetts. He received his bachelor's degree from Harvard University in Cambridge, Massachusetts, in 1915 and his master's degree from the school in 1916. After graduating, he worked for Little Brown and Company, a publishing house, and The New Republic. During World War I, he served in the U.S. Army Signal Corps.

== Career in teaching ==
Morse served as head of the English Department at the Morristown School in Morristown, New Jersey, from 1921 to 1923. In 1923, he joined the faculty in the English Department at Dartmouth College. Dartmouth named him a professor in 1936 and then dean of freshmen in 1946. He served in that role until 1956.

Throughout his life, Morse held an interest in the White Mountains. While teaching at Dartmouth, he co-edited two books on the mountain range: The History of the White Mountains and The Book of the White Mountains. Morse also served as a contributing editor to College on the Hill, a history of Dartmouth prepared for the school's bicentennial in 1969. In 1946, he received an Alfred A. Knopf Fellowship in Biography and History. The fellowship supported his work to write The Yankee Spirit. During his academic career, he published additional books titled: Excerpts from our artistic world and Hopkins of Dartmouth.

== Legacy ==
The Rauner Special Collections Library at Dartmouth College contains Morse's correspondences with fellow scholar Lewis Mumford.

== Family ==
Morse married Helen Field Morse on June 27, 1911. They had three sons and one daughter: Richard, Stephen, Sylvia and Stearns Anthony.
