= American Classic Voyages =

Cruise line

- Company type: Cruising
- Industry: Cruise line
- Founded: 1993, as holding company
- Defunct: 2001
- Headquarters: Chicago, Illinois
- Area served: Hawaii, US East Coast, and Mississippi River system
- Key people: Roderick McLeod (President); Samuel Zell (Chairman)
- Services: Hawaiian Cruises, coastal cruises, riverboat cruises
- Owner: public, Nasdaq: AMCV
- Subsidiaries: American Hawaii Cruises, Delta Queen Steamboat Company, United States Lines, Delta Queen Coastal Voyages
- Website: Official website (defunct)

American Classic Voyages was an American-based cruise ship holding company cruise line, headquartered in Chicago, that operated between 1993 and 2001. The company attempted to take advantage of federal loans and other incentives to build and grow a US-flagged passenger ship industry. The company traded on the Nasdaq Stock Market under the ticker symbol "AMCV". The company operated the Delta Steamboat Company, Delta Queen Coastal Voyages, American Hawaii Cruises and United States Lines.

== History ==
American Classic acquired the Delta Queen Steamboat Company, operators of the famous river boat Delta Queen, along with their acquired subsidiary American Hawaii Cruises, who operated the cruise liners Independence and her sister Constitution, in 1993. In the mid 1990s American Classic was in good shape, with the paddle boats of the Delta Queen Steamboat Company often running at maximum passenger capacity, while the American Hawaii Cruises fleet ran at fairly large passenger capacity but had small MARAD repair loans unpaid. In 1996 Constitution, at 45 years of age, was in need of extensive repairs. These repairs were not carried out, and the Constitution sank while under tow to a scrapyard on November 17, 1997, in over 10,000 feet of water. The wreck was unrecoverable, although insurance would cover her loss.

American Classic Voyages then purchased the Holland America Line cruise ship Nieuw Amsterdam and renamed her the Patriot to operate her in Hawaii beginning on December 9, 2000 under the brand name United States Lines, a revival of the original company which had ended operations in 1986. American Classic Voyages then bought the small coastal cruise ships Cape May Light and Cape Cod Light in hopes of starting a new subsidiary company for these vessels called American Coastal Voyages.

=== Project America ===
The Patriot was reregistered in the United States by special act of Congress as a "stop gap" until a pair of new 72,000 ton cruise ships could be completed in an American shipyard. The decision to relaunch United States Lines was taken, due to the historic connotations of the brand name and the strong association of the American Hawaii brand with its aging ocean liners, being deemed unsuitable for the fresh, modern image American Classic Voyages hoped to create for their Hawaiian operations.

A contract was signed with the Litton-Ingalls yard in Mississippi for construction of the two new ships for United States Lines under the code name Project America. The US government contributed considerable support in the form of loan guarantees, tax credits and a construction mortgage from the Maritime Administration. American Classic Voyages planned to have put six vessels into service by 2004.

== Bankruptcy ==
After the September 11 terrorist attacks caused a slump in the cruise industry, the company started losing large amounts of money. A month after the terrorist attacks, in October 2001, American Classic Voyages filed for Chapter 11 bankruptcy protection, reporting assets of just over $37 million and liabilities of nearly $453 million.

=== Aftermath ===
The company released a statement on their website:

We believe this process will allow us to rebuild our business in the aftermath of the September 11 terrorist attacks and continue our proud tradition as America’s cruise line.

United States Lines, Delta Queen Coastal Voyages, and American Hawaii Cruises immediately ceased operations. amcv.com was taken down by September 21, 2002. The MS Patriot was laid up and eventually sold back to her original owner, Holland America Line, before being chartered to Louis Cruise Lines and being chartered again to Thomson Holidays. The unfinished Project America hulls were later purchased for US$24 million and completed for Norwegian Cruise Line, the resulting ship being the Pride of America. Additional parts from the other mainly unfinished Project America hull were later refitted onto the Pride of Hawaii. Pride of America continues to sail Hawaiian cruises for NCL America, while Pride of Hawaii was eventually transferred to Norwegian Cruise Line as Norwegian Jade. After years of lay-up in California, the American Hawaii Cruises liner Independence was wrecked while under tow bound for the scrapyard, the remains are being broken up on site.

Cape May Light, performed cruises from April 2001 to October 2001 for Delta Queen Coastal Voyages prior to the bankruptcy, and her unfinished sister ship, Cape Cod Light, were repossessed by the shipyard and eventually sold to International Shipping Partners and renamed Sea Discoverer and Sea Voyager, but remained largely unused for years aside from a charter to the US government to house aid workers after the 2010 Haiti earthquake.

The original Delta Queen Steamboat Company division survived the bankruptcy of American Classic Voyages, being purchased by Delaware North Companies in 2002, along with three of its four riverboats (Delta Queen, Mississippi Queen, and American Queen.)

== Former Fleet ==
Ship	Built	In service with American Classic Voyages	Gross tonnage	Flag	Notes	Image
Independence	1951	1996-2001	20,221 tons	United States	Wrecked while being towed to Alang for scrapping.	
Constitution	1951	1982-1997	20,221 tons	United States	Wrecked while being towed to Alang for scrapping.	
Patriot	1983	2000-2001	33,930 tons	United States	Previously Nieuw Amsterdam - scrapped in 2018 by Marella Cruises.	
Unknown	2005	Never entered service	80,439 tons	United States	Was finished by Norwegian Cruise Line as the Pride of America.	
