= United States Lines =

American passenger and shipping line

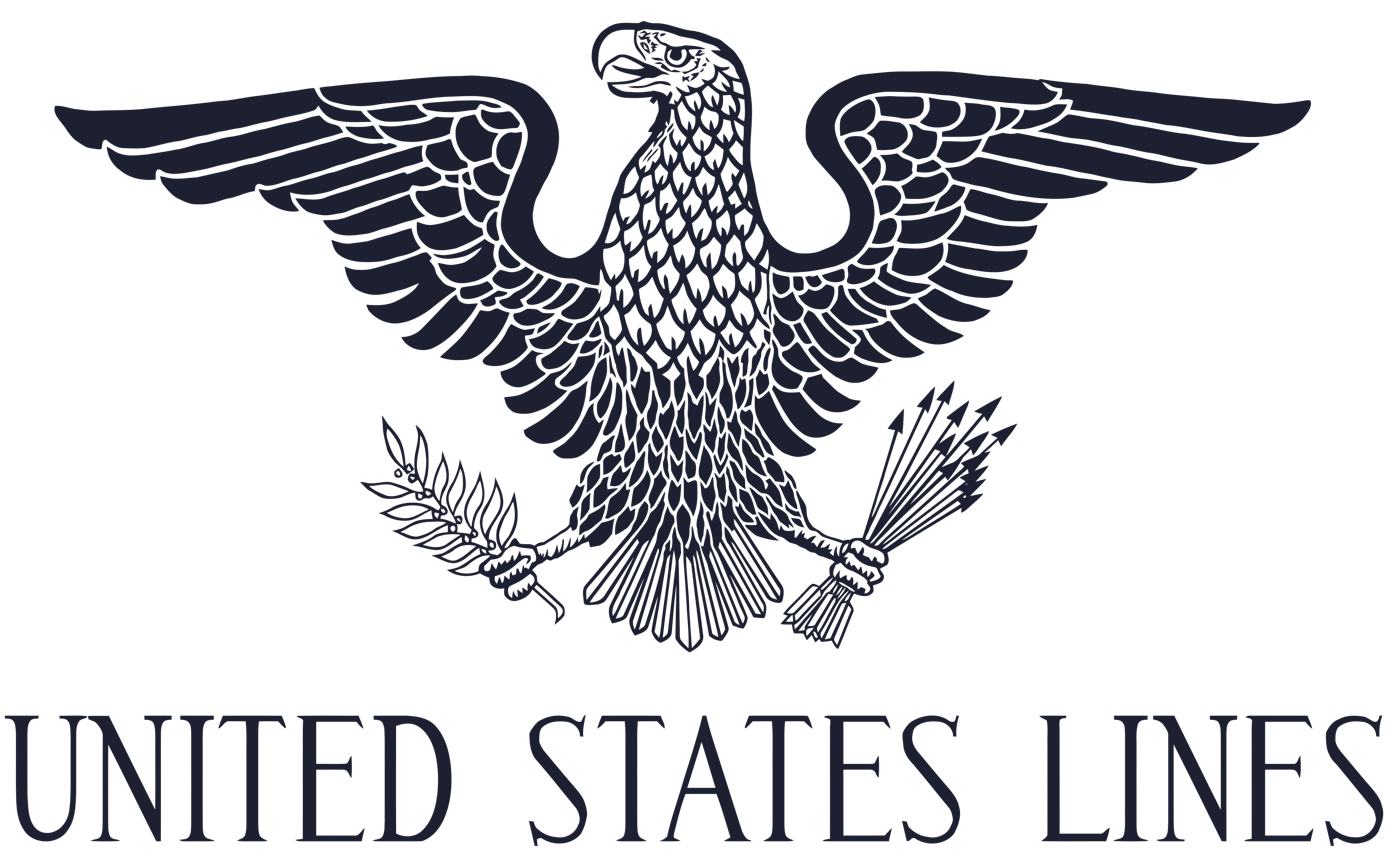
- Type: Government, later Private
- Industry: Shipping, transportation
- Predecessor: United States Mail Steamship Company
- Founded: August 27, 1921
- Defunct: 1992
- Fate: Liquidated
- Headquarters: 1 Broadway, New York City, United States (1943–1978); 45 Broadway, New York City (1921–1943); 27 Commerce Drive, Cranford, NJ
- Area served: New York, Cobh (Queenstown), Plymouth, Cherbourg, London, Bremen (1929 Hamburg), Southampton, Danzig, Liverpool, Manchester, Pauillac (Bordeaux), Le Verdon, Naples, Genoa
- Key people: Kermit Roosevelt(Co-Founder); Paul Wadsworth Chapman (1929–1931); Albert Lasker (1921–1923) (Co-Founder); A.V. Moore (Moore-McCormack)(Co-Founder); W. Averell Harriman (United American Lines)(Co-Founder); Walter Kidde (Company) (1968–1978); Malcolm McLean (1978–1986)

United States Lines was an organization of the United States Shipping Board's (USSB) Emergency Fleet Corporation (EFC), created to operate German liners seized by the United States in 1917. The ships were owned by the USSB and all finances of the line were controlled by the EFC. Among the notable ships of this period was Leviathan, a contender for largest ship in the world for a time.

Eventually the line was sold and went private to continue operating as a transatlantic shipping company that operated cargo services from 1921 to 1989, and ocean liners until 1969—most famously, United States.

== 1920s ==
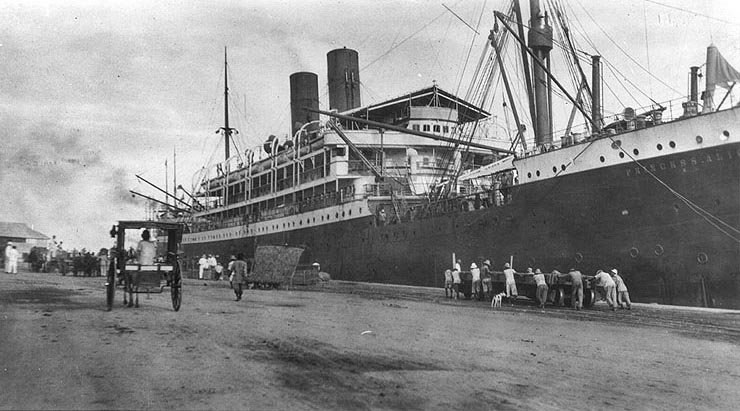
Princess Alice, later Princess Matoika, circa 1914–16

United States Lines was the trade name of the United States Shipping Board's Emergency Fleet Corporation (EFC) organization created to operate the large German liners seized by the United States in 1917. By 1925 the corporation operated ex-German liners Leviathan, George Washington, America, Republic and the USSB built ships President Roosevelt and President Harding in service between New York and Europe. On 15 November 1921 the line began operating from piers 3 and 4 at the USSB's Hoboken Terminal which had been the Hamburg America Line facilities in Hoboken, New Jersey seized by the United States and, during the war, operated by the Army as the Hoboken Port of Embarkation. (Note: President Roosevelt was built as Peninsula State and President Harding as Lone Star State.) The USSB engaged in advertising of the line and its ships through agencies using a "coupon" system to collect names and addresses of interested persons for direct mailings. All the line's funds were managed by the USSB Treasurer.

The line started with three ships from the tonnage of the failed United States Mail Steamship Company. One of the founders was Kermit Roosevelt, son of US President Theodore Roosevelt. Two of the ships, America and George Washington, were originally German vessels that had been seized during World War I and kept as reparations. Both America and George Washington made New York–Bremen runs, while Centennial State ran from New York to London.

The line became well known in the 1920s when two valiant historic rescues were made using their ships President Roosevelt in 1926 and America in 1929 by Captain George Fried.

More ships were acquired in 1922 and renamed after US presidents. The 52,000-ton Leviathan, formerly Vaterland and one of the largest liners in the world, was acquired in 1923.

Throughout the 1920s, the line accumulated debt, and in March 1929, the line was sold to P.W. Chapman Company, and reorganized as the "United States Lines Inc." of Delaware. The stock market crash made matters worse, and in 1931, the remaining ships were sold to "United States Lines Company" of Nevada. Later in 1931, United States Lines was acquired by the Roosevelt International Mercantile Marine Company, which had been formed earlier in the year from the merger of the Roosevelt Steamship Company and International Mercantile Marine Co.

== 1930s ==
In 1932, Manhattan, at a cost of approximately $21 million, became the first ship actually built for the line, followed the next year by Washington. In 1940, a new America joined them.

In 1932, United States Lines had offered to build a new passenger liner, called U.S. Express Liner, which would also double as a mail ship, and would dramatically decrease the time of delivery for trans-Atlantic mail by catapulting an aircraft when it was within range. Congress refused to give a guarantee on trans-Atlantic postal rates and it was never built.

During the 1930s, United States Lines' ailing parent company, Roosevelt International Mercantile Marine, began winding down its other operations and merging several of its divisions into United States Lines. United States Lines absorbed the American Merchant Lines in 1931, the American Line in 1932, and the Baltimore Mail Line in 1937.

== 1940s ==
The decade started with United States Lines absorbing the Roosevelt Line in 1940, leaving United States Lines as Roosevelt International Mercantile Marine's sole operating business. Roosevelt International Mercantile Marine Company finally changed its name to "United States Lines Inc." in 1942, reflecting its new focus.

In World War II, the ships were converted into troopships. Manhattan became USS Wakefield, and Washington became USS Mount Vernon. The flagship America became the USS West Point After the war, the company began to build smaller and cheaper ships, and operated a number of cargo ships, all named beginning with "American" or "Pioneer".

=== Duquesne Spy Ring ===
In 1941, two Nazi spies, Franz Joseph Stigler and Erwin Wilhelm Siegler, worked for United States Lines as members of SS America's crew. While on America, they obtained information about the movement of ships and military defense preparations at the Panama Canal, observed and reported defense preparations in the Canal Zone, and met with other German agents to advise them in their espionage pursuits. They operated as couriers, transmitting information between the United States and German agents aboard. Stigler worked undercover as the chief butcher. Both remained on America until the US Navy converted her into USS West Point.

Stigler and Siegler, along with the 31 other German agents of the Duquesne Spy Ring, were later uncovered by the FBI in the largest espionage conviction in US history. Stigler was sentenced to serve 16 years in prison on espionage charges with two concurrent years for registration violations; Siegler was sentenced to ten years imprisonment on espionage charges and a concurrent 2-year term for violation of the Registration Act.

== Expansion and bankruptcy ==
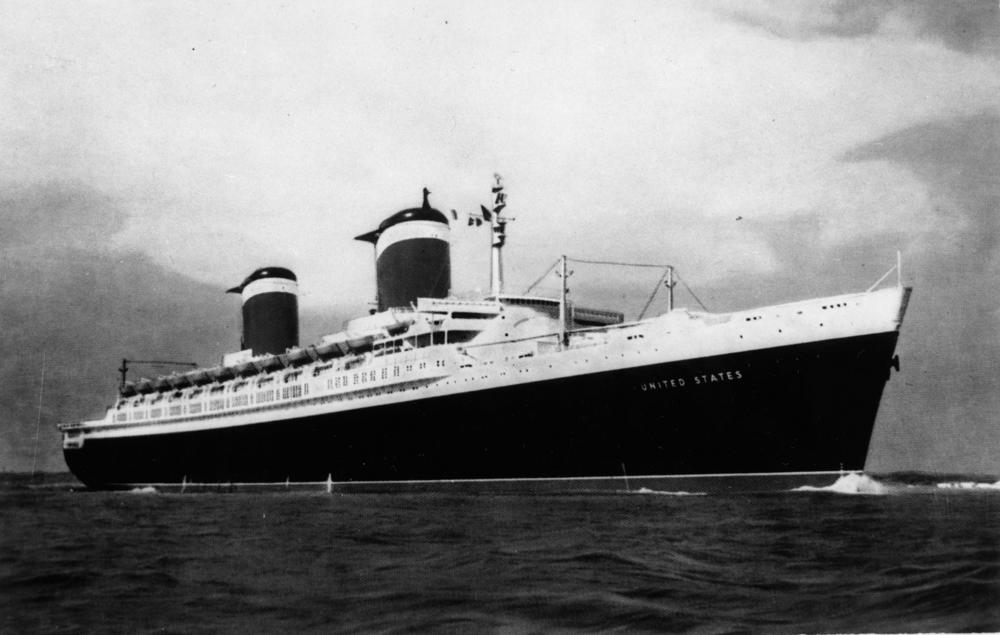
SS United States at sea in 1952

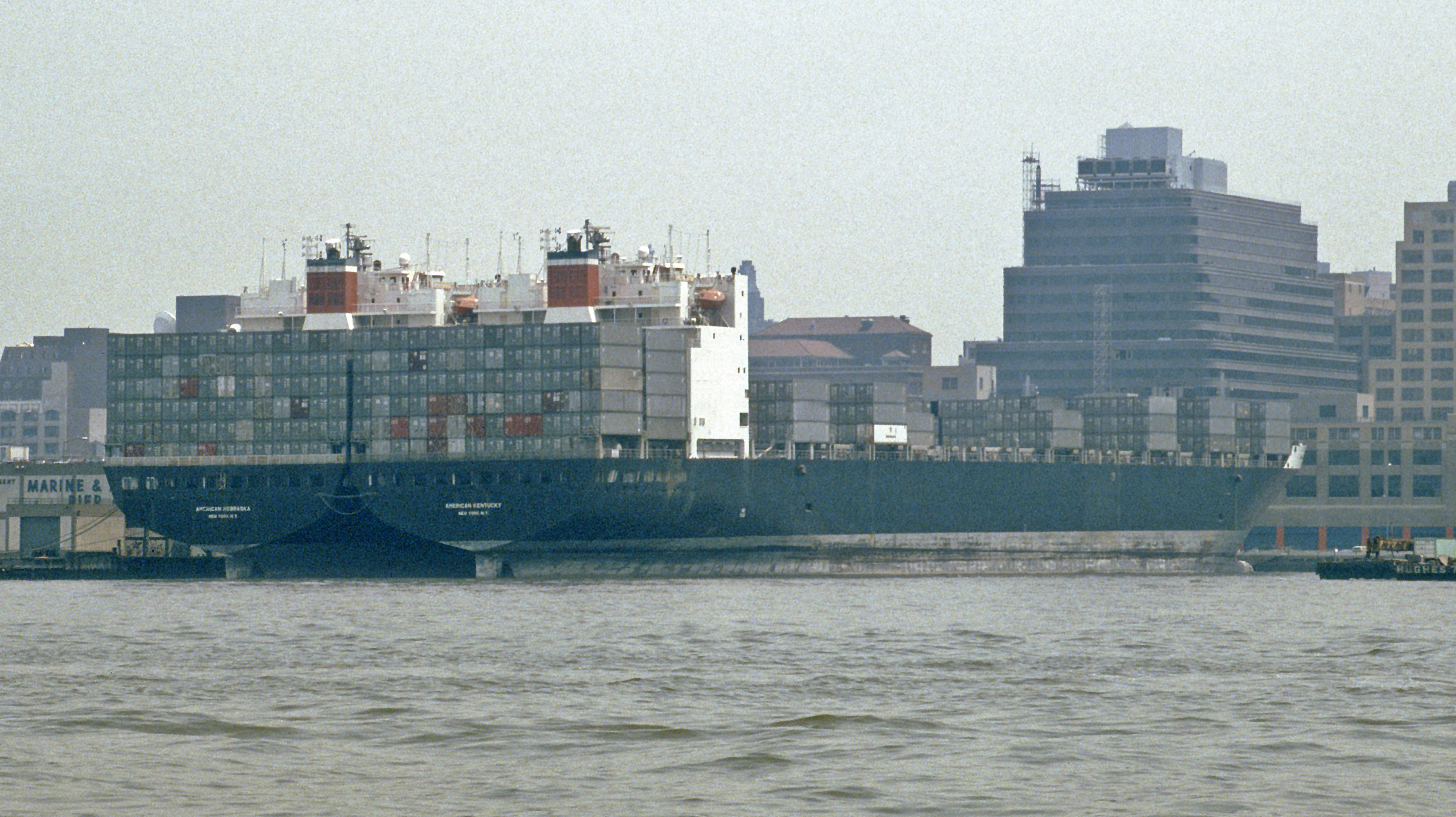
Econships American Nebraska and American Kentucky laid up in New York, 1987

With a government subsidy for her construction, United States entered service in 1952. She holds the record as the largest ocean liner built in the United States and the fastest ocean liner ever built. She immediately set transatlantic speed records, capturing the Blue Riband from Queen Mary. But competition from airliners brought the glory days to an end; in 1964, America was sold to Chandris Line, and United States was withdrawn from service in 1969.

After the termination of passenger services, United States Lines continued to operate as a container ship line, being bought by containerization pioneer Malcom McLean in 1978. By the 1980s, the line operated 43 vessels and was a leader in international shipping. It spent over US$1 billion in rapidly expanding its fleet and acquiring two competitors, Moore-McCormack Lines and Delta Steamship Lines. In expectation of a worldwide surge in oil prices, United States Lines borrowed heavily to construct a new class of 12 fuel-efficient container ships known as the Jumbo Econships that, at over 57,000 gross tons, were the largest cargo ships yet built. Just as the new vessels were delivered, international freight rates fell and oil prices collapsed to near historic lows. The giant and slow Econships left United States Lines overcapacity, deeply in debt, and unable to compete with faster ships that were once again economically viable. Straining under the debt accumulated by the fleet expansion, the company filed for bankruptcy on 24 November 1986 in one of the largest bankruptcies in US history at the time. Most of the vessels were sold to pay creditors and in the reorganization plan filed on 5 July 1988, the company was formally liquidated by 1992.

== Legacy ==
Pursuant to the revised reorganization plan approved by the bankruptcy court in 1989, United States Lines Inc. was restructured as Janus Industries Inc. in November 1990, with its shares distributed to United States Lines creditors and the court-managed bankruptcy trust fund. The company's new management spent several years searching for new business opportunities, finally acquiring Pre-Tek Wireline Service Company, a provider of services to the oil, gas, and logging industries in 1996. In 1997, Janus acquired a number of hospitality assets from companies affiliated with the investors Louis S. Beck and Harry Yeaggy, gaining ownership of 6 hotels, an 85% interest in a 7th hotel, a management company operating another 21 hotels, a fee-sharing joint venture with another management company on another property, and control of two mortgaged-backed loans. Beck and Yeaggy gained control of 43% of Janus Industries, and the former United States Lines decided to concentrate exclusively on the hotel business. Pre-Tek Wireline was spun off to its management in 1998 and Janus Industries changed its name again to Janus Hotels & Resorts Inc. in 1999. United States Lines' successor company now controls hotels and resorts in 21 states.

The name United States Lines was revived briefly in 2000 and 2001, as a brand name of American Classic Voyages, operating cruises in Hawaii with a single ship, MS Patriot, formerly Holland America Line's Nieuw Amsterdam. Construction had begun in 2000 on the future Pride of America, and a 72,000-ton sister ship as part of Project America, but in October 2001, the company filed for bankruptcy and ceased operations. The two unfinished vessels were acquired by Norwegian Cruise Line for their new NCL America division, while Patriot was repossessed by Holland America.

A new container shipping services company called US Lines LLC (Not related to the original company in any way) was established in Santa Ana, California in 2003 by CMA CGM. However, the company announced on December 6, 2016, that US Lines would be phased out and re-branded as ANL.

Several piers in New York City remain as artifacts left behind by the company. Pier 76, United States Lines Terminal, was constructed as a cargo pier on West Side Highway at what was then the foot of 36th Street, and is now in use by Classic Car Club Manhattan, who took over the pier's lease from the NYPD in April 2016. Neon letters spelling "United States Lines" are located on the west side of the pier, facing New Jersey. One letter, "I", on the sign was working until sometime in the 2000s. The sign can be seen by the arriving NY Waterway ferry passengers or those taking the New York Circle Line water tour of Manhattan. The pier head building facing the street is also marked with the Line's name, at each end. Pier 86, United States Lines' passenger pier, still exists, although the pier building has been demolished. The Intrepid Sea, Air & Space Museum is now based there, with USS Intrepid permanently berthed at the pier. In Newport News, Virginia, where many of the United States Lines ships were built, one of the huge propellers from United States is on display at the entrance of the Mariners' Museum.

On February 4, 2016, Crystal Cruises announced a proposal to re-activate the former flagship of the United States Lines, SS United States, for passenger service. Crystal signed a purchase option for the ship and will cover docking costs in Philadelphia for nine months while it conducts a feasibility study. However, Crystal Cruise backed out in August 2016 due to challenges.

On December 10, 2018, the conservancy announced an agreement with the commercial real estate firm RXR Realty, of New York City, to explore options for restoring and redeveloping the ocean liner. In 2015, RXR had expressed interest in developing an out-of-commission ocean liner as a hotel and event venue at Pier 57 in New York. The conservancy requires that any redevelopment plan preserve the ship's profile and exterior design, and include approximately 25,000 sq ft (2,323 m^{2}) for an onboard museum. RXR's press release about the United States stated that multiple locations would be considered, depending on the viability of restoration plans.

Due to a rent dispute, in 2024, the ship was evicted from her pier. Because no other locations for the ship could be found, Okaloosa County, Florida purchased the ship and sank her on November 11,2026 near Destin to become the world's largest artificial reef.

== Ships ==
Name	Years active for USL	Notes
Acadia	1939	Chartered from Eastern SS Lines for one voyage
SS America (1905)	1920-1931	former Amerika
SS America (1940)	1940-41, 1946-1964	USS West Point (1941-1946) Wrecked at Playa de Garcey on Fuerteventura in the Canary Islands in 1994. Subsequently destroyed.
SS American Accord	1970-1986	Type C6-S-1w container ship, IMO 5278901, converted from C4-S-1a cargo ship Pioneer Moor, originally Sunflower Mariner, 1954
SS American Ace	1970-1986	Type C6-S-1w container ship, IMO 5278963, converted from C4-S-1a cargo ship Pioneer Mart, originally Mountain Mariner, 1953
MV American Alabama	1984-1987	Econship container ship, IMO 8212647
SS American Alliance	1970-1987	Type C6-S-1w container ship, IMO 5278913, converted from C4-S-1a cargo ship Pioneer Mill, originally Show Me Mariner, 1954
SS American Altair	1982-1987	Partial container ship, IMO 6421347, originally C4-S-60a Mormacaltair, 1964
SS American Apollo	1970-1988	Type C7-S-68e container ship, IMO 7025269
SS American Aquarius	1971-1988	Type C7-S-68e container ship, IMO 7042485
SS American Archer	1970-1986	Type C6-S-1w container ship, IMO 5278949, converted from C4-S-1a cargo ship Pioneer Mist, originally Peninsula Mariner, 1954
SS American Argo	1982-1986	Partial container ship, IMO 6407949, originally C4-S-60a Mormacargo, 1964
SS American Argosy	1970-1986	Type C6-S-1w container ship, IMO 5278896, converted from C4-S-1a cargo ship Pioneer Main, originally Cotton Mariner, 1953
SS American Astronaut	1969-1988	Type C7-S-68e container ship, IMO 6916861
SS American Banker	1985-1987	1972 Converted container ship, IMO 5277153, originally C5-S-75a Philippine Mail, 1962
SS American Builder	1985-1987	1971 Converted container ship, IMO 5386605, originally C5-S-75a Washington Mail, 1961
MV American California	1985-1987	Econship container ship, IMO 8212702
SS American Challenger	1962-1988	Type C4-S-57a cargo ship, IMO 5014252, renamed Pioneer Moon
SS American Charger	1962-1988	Type C4-S-57a cargo ship, IMO 5014276
SS American Champion	1963-1987	Type C4-S-57a cargo ship, IMO 5014264
SS American Chieftain	1963-1988	Type C4-S-57a cargo ship, IMO 5400528
SS American Commander	1963-1967	Type C4-S-57a cargo ship, IMO 5014305
SS American Contender	1964-1967	Type C4-S-57a cargo ship, IMO 5410119
SS American Contractor	1964-1967	Type C4-S-57a cargo ship
SS American Corsair	1963-1967	Type C4-S-57a cargo ship, IMO 5014317
SS American Clipper	1945-	Type C2-S-AJ5
SS American Counselor		
SS American Courier	1963-1986	Type C4-S-57a cargo ship
SS American Crusader	1964-1967	Type C4-S-57a cargo ship, INO 6404997
SS American Defender	1948-1956	ex-Fordham Victory.
SS American Draco	1982-1987	Partial container ship, IMO 6507921, originally C4-S-60a Mormacdraco, 1965
SS American Entente	1983-1987	Type C6-S-85a container ship, IMO 7326233, originally Austral Entente, 1972
SS American Envoy	1983-1987	Type C6-S-85a container ship, IMO 7116315, originally Austral Envoy, 1972. Now Matson Navigator, 2016.
SS American Farmer	1924-1940	
SS American Flyer	1946-1964	Type C2-S-B1 cargo ship
MV American Georgia	1985-1987	Container ship, IMO 8200711
MV American Hawaii	1984-1987	Ro-Ro/Container ship, IMO 8320559
SS American Hunter		
MV American Illinois	1985-1987	Econship container ship, IMO 8212697
SS American Importer	1931	Ex troopship Somme (1920) originally Design 1024 built Hog Island, renamed American Importer converted United Dry Docks, Brooklyn. 1940 Ville de Gand torpedoed and lost
MV American Kentucky	1985-1987	Econship container ship, IMO 8212661
SS American Lancer	1969-1987	Type C7-S-68c container ship, IMO 6708379
SS American Lark	1969-1987	Type C7-S-68d container ship, IMO 6905252
MS American Leader	1941-1942	Type C1-B cargo ship
SS American Leader (2)	1946-1970	Type C2-S-B1 cargo ship, ex-Twilight
SS American Leader (3)	1970-1986	Type C6-S-1w container ship, IMO 5278937, converted from C4-S-1a cargo ship Pioneer Minx, originally Gopher Mariner, 1953
SS American Legacy	1970-1986	Type C6-S-1w container ship, IMO 5278925, converted from C4-S-1a cargo ship Pioneer Ming, originally Silver Mariner, 1954
SS American Legend	1970-1986	Type C6-S-1w container ship, IMO 5278975, converted from C4-S-1a cargo ship Pioneer Myth, originally Pelican Mariner, 1954
SS American Legion	1968-1987	Type C7-S-68c container ship, IMO 6812211 Flagship after the retirement of SS United States. Later Horizon Challenger.
SS American Liberty	1968-1988	Type C7-S-68d container ship, IMO 6820579 Later Horizon Discovery.
SS American Lynx	1968-1988	Type C7-S-68d container ship, IMO 6828624
MV American Maine	1984-1987	Econship container ship, IMO 8212635
SS American Marketer	1983-1987	Type C6-S-85a container ship, IMO 7218462, originally Austral Ensign, 1973. Later Horizon Fairbanks, laid up 2015.
SS American Merchant	1983-1987	Type C6-S-85a container ship, IMO 7233278, originally Austral Endurance, 1973
MV American Michigan	1985-1987	Ro-Ro/Container ship, IMO 8322789
MV American Nebraska	1984-1987	Econship container ship, IMO 8212673
MV American New Jersey	1984-1987	Econship container ship, IMO 8212623
MV American New York	1984-1987	Econship container ship, IMO 8212611
MV American North Carolina	1984-1987	Ro-Ro/Container ship, IMO 8320547
MV American Ohio	1985-1987	Container ship, IMO 8200709
MV American Oklahoma	1985-1987	Econship container ship, IMO 8212685
SS American Pioneer	1983-1987	Type C8-S-85d container ship, IMO 7617890, originally Austral Pioneer, 1979
SS American Puritan	1983-1987	Type C8-S-85d container ship, IMO 7617905, originally Austral Pioneer, 1980
SS American Racer	1964-1983	Type C4-S-68a cargo ship, IMO 6414069
SS American Ranger	1965-1983	Type C4-S-68a cargo ship, IMO 6423943
SS American Reliance	1965-1983	Type C4-S-68a cargo ship, IMO 6507751
SS American Reservist	1983-1986	Partial container ship, IMO 6415960, originally C4-S-60a Mormaclynx, 1964
SS American Resolute	1965-1969	Type C4-S-68a cargo ship, IMO 6515643
SS American Resolute (2)	1982-1986	Type C5-S-73b container ship, IMO 7635945, originally Resolute, 1980
SS American Reporter		
SS American Rigel	1982-1986	Partial container ship, IMO 6417425, originally C4-S-60a Mormarigel, 1965
SS American Rover	1965-1969	Type C4-S-68a cargo ship, IMO 6418091
SS American Scout		
SS American Shipper		
SS American Trader	1979-1979	1977 converted container ship, IMO 7117670, originally C8-S-81b LASH barge & container carrier Pacific Bear, 1971
SS American Traveler		
MV American Utah	1985-1987	Econship container ship, IMO 8212714
SS American Vega	1982-1986	Partial container ship, IMO 6411251, originally C4-S-60a Mormacvega, 1964
MV American Virginia	1985-1987	Econship container ship, IMO 8212659
MV American Washington	1985-1987	Econship container ship, IMO 8212726
SS Argentina	1929-1942	Refitted and renamed from SS Pennsylvania in 1938
SS Brazil	1928-1964	Refitted and renamed from SS Virginia in 1938
SS California	1927-1964	Refitted and renamed to SS Uruguay in 1938
SS Centennial State		
SS Ernie Pyle		
SS George Washington	1921-1931	Later USS Catlin (AP-19)
SS Granite State		
SS Hudson		
SS Iroquois		
SS John Ericsson		
SS Leviathan	1923-1933	former Vaterland
SS Lone Star State	1922	See SS President Harding
Manhattan	1932-1941	later USS Wakefield (AP-21)
SS Marine Falcon		
SS Marine Flasher		
SS Marine Jumper		
SS Marine Marlin		
SS Marine Perch		
SS Marine Shark		
SS Marine Swallow		
SS Marine Tiger		
SS Mormactide	1983-1986	Renamed USTS Empire State, scrapped in 2022
SS Old North State	1921-1922	See SS President Van Buren
SS Orizaba	1939	Chartered for one voyage from Ward Line
SS Panhandle State		
SS Peninsular State		
SS Pennsylvania	1929-1964	Refitted and renamed to SS Argentina in 1938
SS Pioneer Commander	1967-1981	Type C4-S-57a cargo ship, IMO 5014305, originally American Commander, 1963
SS Pioneer Contender	1967-1988	Type C4-S-57a cargo ship, IMO 5410119, originally American Contender, 1964
SS Pioneer Contractor	1967-1981	Type C4-S-57a cargo ship, originally American Contractor, 1964
SS Pioneer Corsair	1967-1988	Type C4-S-57a cargo ship, IMO 5014317, originally American Corsair, 1963
SS Pioneer Crusader	1967-	Type C4-S-57a cargo ship, originally American Crusader, 1964
SS Pioneer Glen
SS Pioneer Land
SS Pioneer Main	1956-1970	Type C4-S-1a cargo ship, IMO 5278896, originally Cotton Mariner, 1953
SS Pioneer Mart	1956-1971	Type C4-S-1a cargo ship, IMO 5278901, originally Sunflower Mariner, 1954
SS Pioneer Mill	1956-1970	Type C4-S-1a cargo ship, IMO 5278913, originally Show Me Mariner, 1954
SS Pioneer Ming	1956-1971	Type C4-S-1a cargo ship, IMO 5278925, originally Silver Mariner, 1954
SS Pioneer Mist	1956-1970	Type C4-S-1a cargo ship, IMO 5278949, originally Peninsula Mariner, 1954
SS Pioneer Minx	1956-1970	Type C4-S-1a cargo ship, IMO 5278937, originally Gopher Mariner, 1953
SS Pioneer Moon	1962-1988	Type C4-S-57a cargo ship, IMO 5014252. She was the renamed American Challenger, the lead ship of the type
SS Pioneer Moor	1956-1970	Type C4-S-1a cargo ship, IMO 5278963, originally Mountain Mariner, 1953
SS Pioneer Muse	1956-1961	Type C4-S-1a cargo ship, originally Nutmeg Mariner, 1953
SS Pioneer Myth	1956-1970	Type C4-S-1a cargo ship, IMO 5278975, originally Pelican Mariner, 1954
SS Pioneer Tide		
SS Potomac		
SS President Adams		
SS President Arthur		
SS President Fillmore		
SS President Garfield		
SS President Harding	1922-1940	Previously Lone Star State and President Taft. Transatlantic liner, sold 1940.
SS President Monroe		
SS President Polk		
SS President Roosevelt		
SS President Taft	1922	See SS President Harding
SS President Van Buren	1921-1924	Named Old North State 1921-1922
SS Princess Matoika	1921-1922	Originally SS Kiautschou (German Passenger Liner, 1900)
SS Republic		
SS St John	1939	Chartered from Eastern SS Lines for one voyage
SS Shawnee	1939	Chartered from Clyde Line for one voyage.
SS Susquehanna		
SS United States	1952-1969	Sunk as an artificial reef in 2026
SS Uruguay	1927-1964	Refitted and renamed from SS California in 1938
SS Virginia	1928-1964	Refitted and renamed to SS Brazil in 1938
SS Washington		

== See also ==
- Ocean liner
