= Passenger Vessel Services Act of 1886 =

US federal law

- Long title: An Act to abolish certain fees for official services to American vessels, and to amend the laws relating to shipping commissioners, seamen, and owners of vessels, and for other purposes.
- Enacted by: the 49th United States Congress
- Effective: June 19, 1886

Citations
- Public law: Pub. L. 49–421
- Statutes at Large: 24 Stat. 79, Chap. 421

Codification
- Titles amended: 46 U.S.C.: Shipping
- U.S.C. sections created: 46 U.S.C. § 55103

Legislative history
- Introduced in the House as H.R. 10703 by Nelson Dingley Jr. (R-ME); Signed into law by President Grover Cleveland on June 19, 1886

The Passenger Vessel Services Act of 1886, sometimes abbreviated to PVSA, Passenger Services Act, or PSA, is a protectionist piece of United States legislation that came into force in 1886 relating to cabotage. The law states that no foreign vessels may transport passengers between ports or places in the United States, either directly or by way of a foreign port, under a penalty of $200 for each passenger so transported and landed. The statutory penalty has been adjusted for inflation under the Federal Civil Penalties Inflation Adjustment Act of 1990, as amended (28 U.S.C. § 2461 note). As of 2025, the penalty was $996 for each passenger transported in violation of the law.

As a result, all vessels that have engaged in the coastwise trade have been required to be coastwise-qualified (i.e., U.S.-built, owned, and documented). Under the Passenger Vessel Services Act of 1886 (46 USC § 55103), non-coastwise-qualified vessels cannot transport passengers directly between U.S. ports. Generally, a passenger is any person carried on a vessel who is not directly and substantially connected with the operation of such vessel, its navigation, ownership, or business. The precise definition of what constitutes a U.S. port ("coastwise point") includes artificial islands and similar structures, as well as to mobile oil drilling rigs, drilling platforms, and other devices attached to the seabed of the Outer Continental Shelf for the purpose of resource exploration operations, and the anchored warehouse vessels that supply drilling platforms.

The handful of U.S.-flagged cruise ships in operation are registered in the U.S. to permit cruises between the Hawaiian Islands, or from the continental U.S. to Hawaii.

The Passenger Vessel Services Act, however,

- does not prohibit foreign-flagged ships departing from and returning to the same U.S. port provided the ship visits any foreign port;
- does not prohibit foreign-flagged ships departing from a U.S. port, visiting a distant foreign port, and then continuing to a second U.S. port. However, in order to embark in a U.S. port and disembark in a second U.S. port, the vessel must visit a distant foreign port outside of North America (Central America, Bermuda, the Bahamas, and all of the Caribbean except Aruba, Bonaire, and Curaçao, count as part of North America);

In accordance with the law, cruise lines that operate foreign-flagged vessels are fined for each passenger who boarded such a vessel in one U.S. port and left the vessel at another port. The cruise lines typically pass this cost onto passengers who "jump ship." Exemptions are available such as in the case of family emergencies.

== Exceptions ==
Some exceptions have been made to the requirement of the Passenger Services Act. For example, Canadian vessels may transport passengers between Rochester, New York and Alexandria Bay, New York until such time as a U.S. carrier enters the market (46 USC § 55121(a)), and between ports in southeastern Alaska (46 USC § 55121(b)).

As of October 30, 2003, foreign vessels are also allowed to transport passengers (but not cargo) between the U.S. mainland and Puerto Rico (46 USC § 55104). However, this exemption will disappear if U.S.-flagged ships resume passenger operations of this type.

During the COVID-19 pandemic, Canada prohibited all cruise ship traffic, which had the effect of blocking all cruise ships to Alaska (which, because of the PVSA, had to originate or stop in British Columbia). In response, President Biden signed the Alaska Tourism Restoration Act, which temporarily waived the foreign port requirement, allowing certain cruise ships named in the Act to sail straight from Seattle to Alaska. This waiver expired in March 2022.

Waivers from the PVSA can be requested in case of national-defense interest.

== Inter-island transportation in Hawaii ==
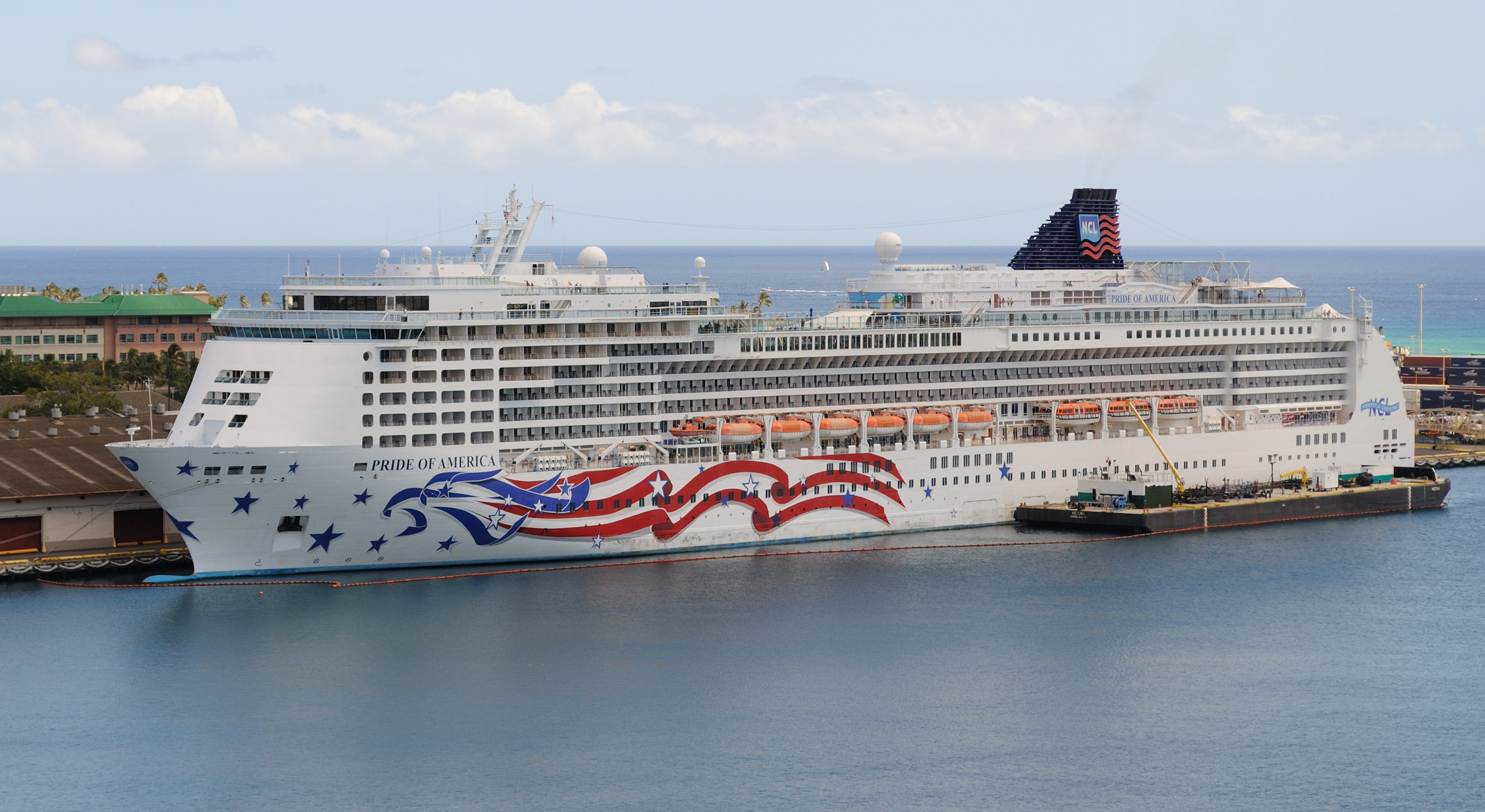
MS Pride of America, one of NCL America's U.S.-flagged ships, not required to call on foreign ports.

The law has had an interesting consequence with regard to the cruise-ship industry within the state of Hawaii. Foreign-flagged cruise ships may carry passengers between ports in the Hawaiian Islands as long as no passenger permanently leaves the vessel at ports other than the origination port and the vessel makes at least one call at a foreign port. Norwegian Cruise Line created a subsidiary, NCL America, and introduced three new U.S.-flagged vessels: Pride of Aloha in 2004, Pride of America in 2005, and Pride of Hawaii in 2006. Previously, with its foreign-flagged vessels, NCL needed to include a four-day detour to Tabuaeran (Fanning Atoll) in the Line Islands (Republic of Kiribati) on its Hawaiian itineraries.

Reportedly due to financial losses, in 2007 NCL renamed Pride of Hawaii to Norwegian Jade, and reflagged and relocated the ship to Europe. In 2008, NCL also relocated Pride of Aloha to Florida, reflagging and renaming her to Norwegian Sky at the same time. Thus Pride of America is the sole NCL ship currently in Hawaii service.

== See also ==
- Merchant Marine Act of 1920, commonly referred to as the Jones Act, a protectionist law that applies to vessels transporting cargo between United States ports
