= List of ship launches in 2025 =

This is a chronological list of some ships launched in 2025.

Date	Ship	Class / type	Builder	Location	Country	Notes
18 January	Asuka III	Cruise ship	Meyer Werft	Papenburg	Germany	For Nippon Yusen Kaisha
25 January	Four Seasons I	Yacht	Fincantieri	Ancona	Italy	For Four Seasons Yachts
January	Asuka III	Cruise ship	Meyer Werft	Papenburg	Germany	For Nippon Yusen
13 March	Norwegian Luna	Prima-class cruise ship	Fincantieri	Marghera	Italy	For Norwegian Cruise Line
April	Adora Flora City	Vista-class cruise ship	CSSC Shanghai Waigaoqiao Shipbuilding		China	For Adora Cruises
17 April	Viking Amun	Nile river cruise ship	Massara shipyard	Cairo	Egypt	For Viking
2 May	China Zorrilla	Type Hull 096 fast ferry	Incat		Australia	For Buquebus
May	Mein Schiff Flow	cruise ship	Fincantieri		Italy	For TUI Cruises
9 May	Viking Thoth	Nile river cruise ship	Massara shipyard	Cairo	Egypt	For Viking
June	Capu Rossu	E-Flexer-class ferry	AVIC		China	For Stena RoRo
16 June	OE Corinthian	Sail-powered ocean liner	Chantiers de l'Atlantique	Saint-Nazaire	France	Orient Express Silenseas
July	Explora III		Fincantieri	Sestri Ponente	Italy	
July	Viking Mira		Fincantieri		Italy	For Viking Ocean Cruises
Unknown date	Leonine	G9 RoRo-vessel	Hyundai Mipo Dockyard		South Korea	For CLdN
9 August	Disney Destiny	Wish-class	Meyer Werft	Papenburg	Germany	
October	Menawethan	Freight vessel	Piriou's Shipyard	Ho Chi Minh City	United Kingdom	For the Isles of Scilly Steamship Company
October	Magellan Explorer		Asenav	Valdivia	Chile	For Antarctica21
