= Allison Hueman =

Filipino-American graffiti artist

- Born: Allison Torneros; 1985 (age 39–40); Daly City, California, U.S.
- Known for: Graffiti; Street art

Allison Torneros Tinati, professionally known as Hueman, is a Filipino-American graffiti artist, painter, and illustrator based in Oakland, California. Hueman's best-known works include the Golden State Warriors 2022-23 City Edition Uniforms and basketball court, Bloom, a mural in the Los Angeles Arts District commemorating community advocate Joel Bloom, and the cover artwork for Pink’s 2019 record, Hurts 2B Human. As street art is a medium dominated by men, Hueman is noted as a female artist who has achieved significant renown. In 2013, she was one of the first artists commissioned to paint a city mural after Los Angeles lifted its street art ban.

== Early life ==
The daughter of a computer engineer, Hueman was born in Daly City, California and raised in Northern California. Hueman was attracted to art at an early age and was influenced by graffiti and other forms of street art in Oakland and San Francisco. Initially, she planned to focus on special effects or motion graphics while attending college in Los Angeles. She is a self-taught painter.

== Career ==
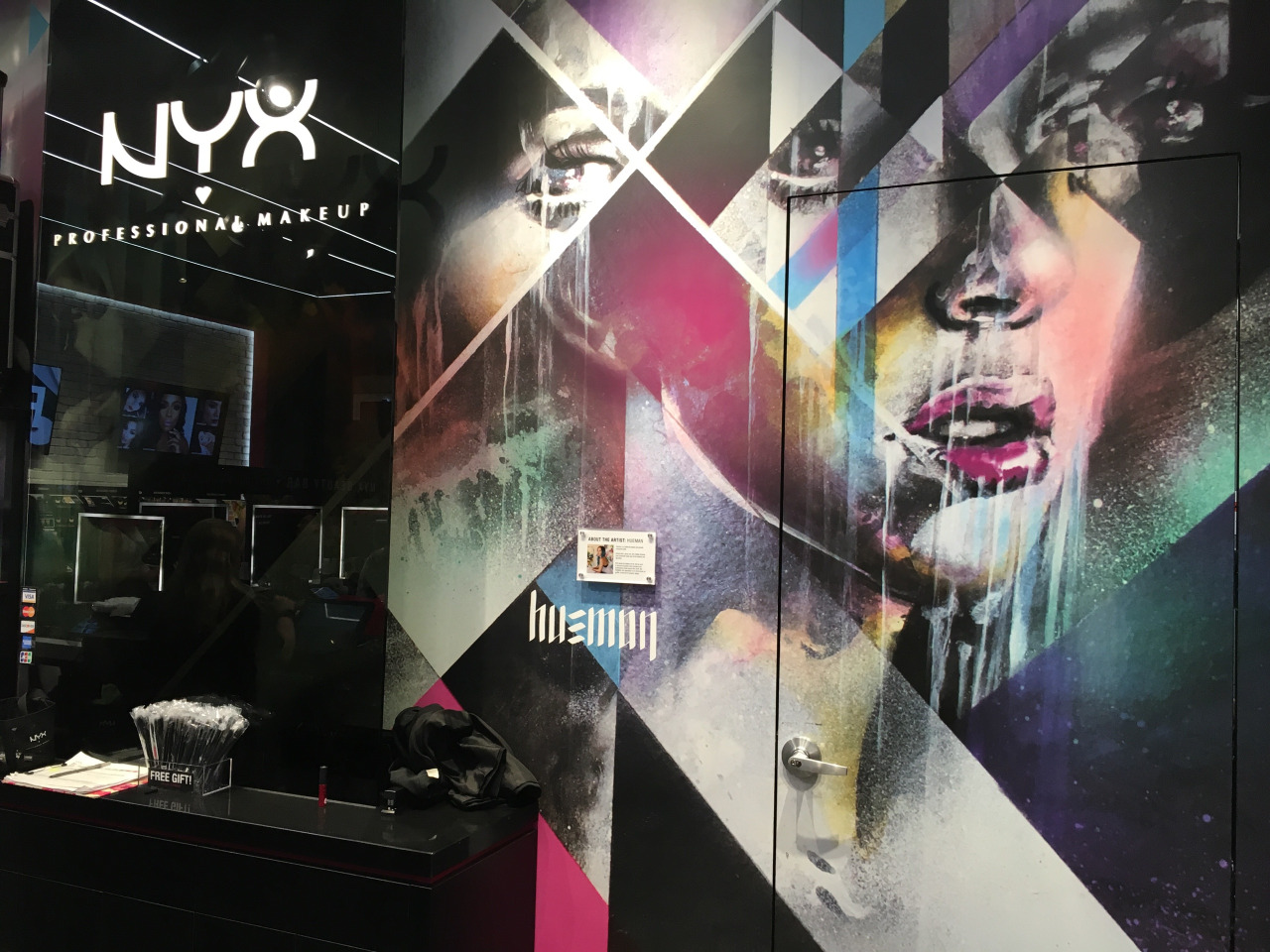
Hueman partnered with NYX Cosmetics in 2015 to create custom artwork for their products and stores

Hueman graduated from the University of California Los Angeles in 2008 with a degree in design and media arts. After graduating, she worked as a freelance graphic designer and web designer.

=== Early commissions and murals ===
Early works by Hueman include a Nike-commissioned portrait of Kobe Bryant to commemorate his 81 point basketball game; a mural for P Diddy's Revolt TV office; and Ritual (2013), a 9-day, free-styled, floor-to-ceiling mural installation in a 5,000 sq foot warehouse space. In May 2014, Hueman was named one of LA Weekly's People of the Year and was featured on a limited-edition cover of the issue.

In 2015, she and artist Daniela Rocha curated Wander and Wayfare, which featured murals painted around San Francisco by eight female street artists, as well as a gallery art show. The event was described as "an annual exhibition and mural festival that plans to brighten the future of the San Francisco art scene." That July, she also participated in the second annual series of Sea Walls: Murals for Oceans, organized by PangeaSeed in Cozumel, Mexico.

Premiering in the SF Bay Area in January 2022, Homebody was an immersive art experience that explored shifting identities while living under government-mandated isolation, inviting viewers to engage with Hueman’s work at the intersection of art and technology. The original exhibit spanned over 20,000 square feet, allowing guests to journey through five cohesive installations. Translucent floor-to-ceiling installations expanded upon Hueman’s Veiled Intent series of work, which play with themes of transparency, light, color and space. The 360 immersive experience was brought to animated life by video projection mapping and augmented reality activated on visitors’ smart devices.

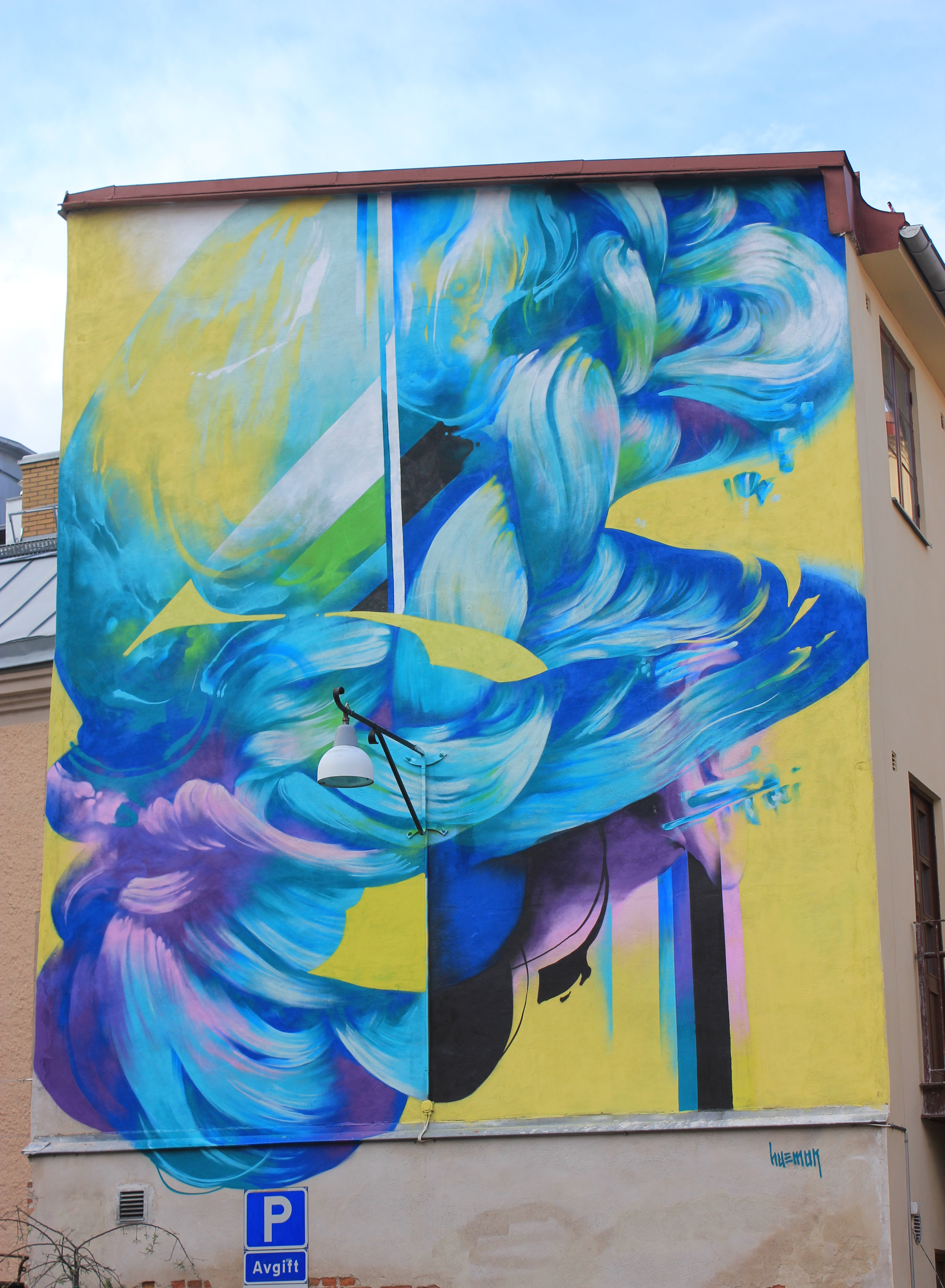
"Göteborg Braided Sisters" mural, located in Gothenburg, Sweden (2016).

==== Bloom ====
Following changes to the Mural Ordinance in Los Angeles in 2013, Hueman was commissioned to create a mural honoring educator and activist Joel Bloom. The spray painted work is located at Joel Bloom Square in the city's arts district. Set against a pale-blue background, the mural depicts a hand clutching a bouquet of flowers. Bloom is the first of Hueman's to incorporate type and not just images.

=== Brand collaborations and commercial projects ===
Filmmaker Ava Duvernay commissioned Hueman to paint the facade of her production company Array in 2019. Other projects include a large mural that spans five buildings at Hickory Alley (San Francisco) titled Spray Ballet funded by the SF Community Challenge Grant; the design of a Nike shoe for the U.S. women's basketball team in the 2016 Olympics; and a collaboration with Forever 21.

Hueman partnered with NYX Cosmetics in 2015 to create custom artwork for their products and stores. In 2023 it was announced that Hueman had painted the hull art for Norwegian Cruise Line's ship, Norwegian Aqua, debuting in 2025. Hueman is the first female artist to be featured on the hull of an NCL ship.

==== The Golden State Warriors and the Golden State Valkyries ====
Hueman designed a refurbished basketball court for the West Contra Costa Salesian Boys & Girls Club, which was unveiled by Stephen Curry as part of a Women's Empowerment Month celebration in March 2019. The following year, Hueman teamed up with Under Armour and Stephen Curry for the release of the Curry 8 Flow, which contains multi-colored graffiti art patterns. This is the first signature shoe debuting under the two-time NBA MVP’s namesake brand. This same design was used in the refurbishment of the Manzanita court in Oakland, as a part of Curry’s efforts to give back to the community.

In 2022, Hueman designed the Golden State Warriors 2022-23 Nike NBA City Edition uniform and basketball court. The NBA is calling the “photo-real style the first of its kind on an NBA jersey,” according to Nadia Roohparvar, the league’s manager of on-court and brand partnerships. The centerpiece of the uniform is a yellow rose, representing women who have changed the trajectory of history in their various industries. Hueman dedicated the design specifically to Iranian women and her own half-Persian daughters. The emblem on the chest emanates rays of sunshine, symbolizing power and strength, and the gradient on the side of the uniform represents the diversity of the Bay Area. Lastly, the uniform type face sources inspiration from the historic Art Deco landmarks in the Bay Area. This jersey was voted #1 best jersey in the NBA by the LA Times.

In 2025, Hueman created a 215-foot mural at the entrance of the new training facility for the Golden State Valkyries in Oakland. The piece, which depicts women warriors cloaked in swirling hues of purple, white, and black, evokes the Sistine Chapel mural painted by Michelangelo.

=== Television appearances ===
In 2013, Allison Hueman was featured in season 8, episode 27 of Pawn Stars “Say It, Don't Spray It.” During the episode she is seen painting a mural of the main cast on the garage door of the Gold and Silver Pawn shop. The mural is still there today and is similar in design to Mount Rushmore.

== Style and influences ==
Hueman's signature style includes bright colors and elements of abstract portraiture, also referred to as "etherealism." Her work has been described as a product of "free association" and improvisation. Hueman frequently uses spray paint and acrylics in her creations and has been influenced by graffiti art. Many of her themes reflect women's experiences.

The name "Hueman" comes from the feelings she had after starting to paint murals for the first time. In a profile in Juxtapoz, she states,"I began painting murals after a dark period in my life when I felt like there was nothing left to lose, and when I painted big for the first time, it was like a light switch turned on. Once I got out of my studio and onto the street, I was using my entire body to paint, I was talking to people, I was collaborating, I was in the sun. I felt alive again. I literally felt human. That's where the name Hueman comes from."

== Personal life ==
Hueman married Cyrus Tinati, her high school sweetheart in 2016. She lived in Los Angeles for 10 years before returning to the San Francisco Bay Area.
