= Norwegian Epic =

Cruise ship

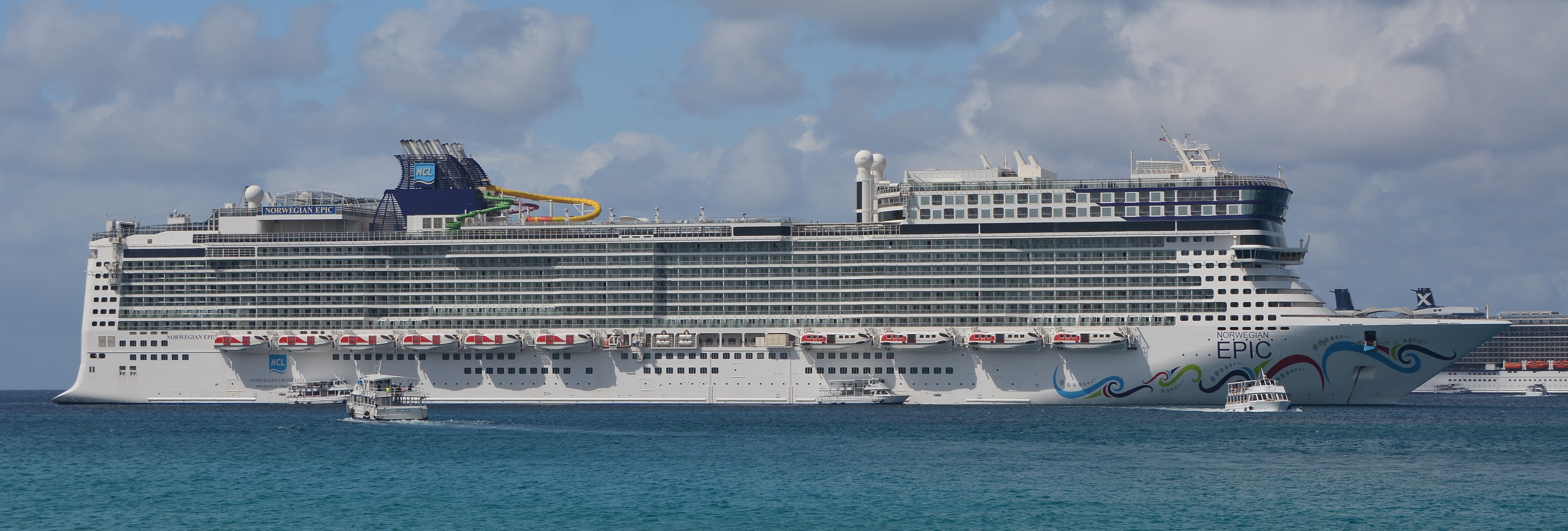
- Norwegian Epic near George Town, Cayman Islands in 2016

History

Bahamas
- Name: Norwegian Epic
- Owner: Norwegian Cruise Line Holdings
- Operator: Norwegian Cruise Line
- Port of registry: Nassau, Bahamas
- Ordered: 9 September 2006
- Builder: STX France Cruise, Chantiers de l'Atlantique shipyard, Saint-Nazaire, France
- Cost: $1.2 billion
- Yard number: C33
- Laid down: 19 June 2008
- Launched: 10 July 2009
- Sponsored by: Reba McEntire
- Christened: 2 July 2010
- Identification: Call sign: C6XP7; IMO number: 9410569; MMSI number: 311018500
- Status: In service

General characteristics
- Class & type: Epic-class cruise ship
- Tonnage: 155,873 GT; 146,495 NT; 10,850 DWT
- Length: 329.45 m (1,081 ft)
- Beam: 40.64 m (133 ft)
- Height: 61 m (200 ft)
- Draft: 8.7 m (29 ft)
- Depth: 21.6 m (71 ft)
- Decks: 19
- Installed power: 3 × MaK 16M43 (3 × 15,200 kW); 3 × MaK 12M43 (3 × 11,400 kW)
- Propulsion: Diesel-electric; two shafts (2 × 24 MW); Wärtsilä fixed-pitch propellers; Four Wärtsilä bow thrusters and two stern thrusters
- Speed: 22 knots (41 km/h; 25 mph)
- Capacity: 4,100 (double occupancy)
- Crew: 1,724

Norwegian Epic is a cruise ship of the Norwegian Cruise Line built under NCL's F3 Project by the STX Europe Chantiers de l'Atlantique shipyard in Saint-Nazaire, France. When launched in 2010 she was the third largest cruise ship in the world.

Two ships in the Epic class were ordered by NCL in November 2006, with an option for a third vessel that was not exercised. A dispute between NCL and STX initially resulted in the construction of both ships being placed on hold until a new agreement was reached. The agreement called for completion of the first ship; the second ship was cancelled in 2008. The sole remaining ship, Norwegian Epic, was delivered to NCL on 17 June 2010.

After completion and acceptance, Norwegian Epic sailed on 24 June 2010 from Southampton to New York.

== Overview ==
Norwegian Epic surpasses the Breakaway-class as NCL's second largest ship class. She represents the "third generation" of Freestyle cruising vessels and her size allows NCL to have ships in the "mega-class" of their competitors in Royal Caribbean International and Carnival Cruise Lines, though she is still 32% smaller by gross tonnage than Royal Caribbean's Oasis-class ships, the world's largest passenger vessels at the time of her construction.

Norwegian Epic has 4,100 passenger berths and the only tube-and-bowl water slide at sea. The ship also has a rappelling wall and a three-lane bowling alley together with a 17 °F (−8 °C) Ice Bar where customers have to wear parkas.

On 13 April 2010, NCL CEO Kevin Sheehan along with Macy's Inc CEO Terry J. Lundgren and NBC CEO Jeff Zucker announced that the 34th Annual Macy's 4th of July Fireworks would take place aboard the Norwegian Epic. The NBC One-Hour Telecast of the Event was broadcast from the Norwegian Epic.

On 2 July 2010, the ship was christened at a ceremony in New York by her godmother, American country music artist Reba McEntire.

== Concept and construction ==
Norwegian Epic is powered by a diesel-electric plant, with the six long-stroke MaK engines providing a total of 79.8 MW for ship propulsion and on-board electricity supply. Electrical power then drives high-torque density induction motors which turn two conventional (non-azimuthing) propellers.

The F3-class ship was built by STX Europe at the Chantiers de l'Atlantique shipyard in Saint-Nazaire, France. The last ship delivered to NCL before this order that was not at least partially built at a German shipyard was the Windward of 1993. Prior, NCL's new ships had been built at the German Meyer Werft, Lloyd Werft, Bremer Vulkan and Aker MTW shipyards.

In September 2008, a dispute over the price of the first F3 vessel (at the time approximately 25% complete) arose between Norwegian Cruise Line and STX France. Reportedly, the sale of 50% of NCL to Apollo Management in August 2007 resulted in Apollo making several changes to the designs, resulting in a higher cost for the first vessel. One of the changes included the addition of three decks atop her superstructure as a homage to the Norway, which was sold for scrap the year before, despite the decks being criticized for making the vessel appear top-heavy. A dispute between NCL and STX initially resulted in the construction of both ships being placed on hold until a new agreement was reached. It was reported that the construction of the second ship was unaffected by the dispute, but ultimately it was decided that the first ship would be completed and the construction of the second ship was canceled. Despite this agreement, there has not been another ship built at STX France, with all future ships having been ordered from German Meyer Werft due to strained relations with STX.

The sea trials of Norwegian Epic occurred over four days beginning on 10 February 2010. During these trials 300 technicians and engineers from STX France, along with 30 Norwegian Cruise Line representatives, checked more than 60 aspects of the ship's performance by running trials of the ship's speed, maneuverability, hydrodynamics and propulsion in the Atlantic Ocean.

In early May 2010, a fire broke out in a provisioning area aft on Deck 4; firefighters were able to contain the fire before it spread, with the only damage to an area of cabling. The conditions were found to be suspicious (there was no welding or other 'hot' work in the area, and the extinguishing system was non-operational), and the event was investigated by Saint-Nazaire police as arson. It was suspected some workers may have deliberately set the fire in an act of payback for the price dispute between NCL and STX France. Despite the damage, Norwegian Epic was delivered on time.

A second round of sea trials was conducted on 11 June 2010, which finalized all the aspects of the ship. Afterwards, the ship, named the Norwegian Epic, was delivered to NCL on 17 June 2010.

== Areas of operation ==
Norwegian Epic was originally based out of Miami, sailing Western Caribbean cruises. In 2013 and 2014, Norwegian Epic undertook winter cruises between October and April sailing from Miami, FL to the Caribbean and after a repositioning transatlantic sailing, undertook cruises from southern European ports around the Mediterranean between April and October.

In April 2015, Norwegian Epic repositioned and had a home port year round in Barcelona.

In November 2016 Norwegian Epic returned to the Caribbean, this time based out of Port Canaveral (Orlando). Then Barcelona for April to November 2017, and back to Port Canaveral for winter 2017/18.

Beginning in January 2017, she began hosting the annual dance music festival Holy Ship!.

In March 2022, Norwegian Cruise Lines announced that in 2023, the Epic was to be redeployed from her current summer itinerary and that all cruises aboard the ship from May through October were cancelled.

== Incidents ==
On 7 August 2018, Norwegian Epic experienced a minor engine fault at 11 pm. The situation was described as being under control, however witnesses said that lifeboats were in the process of being launched. The problem was fixed in an hour.

On 12 February 2019, after suffering a critical engine failure, Norwegian Epic collided with a dock at San Juan, Puerto Rico, causing minor damage to the ship but significantly damaging the dock. At the time of the incident, the Norwegian Epic was diverting to San Juan following power outages and mechanical problems. Due to the damage, the ship canceled all other scheduled ports of call for repairs. The NTSB investigation into the accident found that there was a lack of onboard communication between the ship master and the pilot.

On 8 June 2019, a 63-year-old South Korean woman fell overboard from Norwegian Epic while she was travelling from Cannes, France, to Palma de Mallorca, Spain. After several hours of searching, involving the relevant authorities and the Norwegian Epic herself, the search was called off, although the woman is still missing.

On 26 December 2024, one passenger fell overboard from Norwegian Epic. After several hours of searching, involving the relevant authorities and the Norwegian Epic herself, the search was called off, although the passenger is still missing.

== Media ==
Norwegian Epic was the subject of Mighty Ships series 5, episode 1, first broadcast July 2011.
