= MV Leisure World =

Cruise ship, 1969 to 2021

MS Skyward
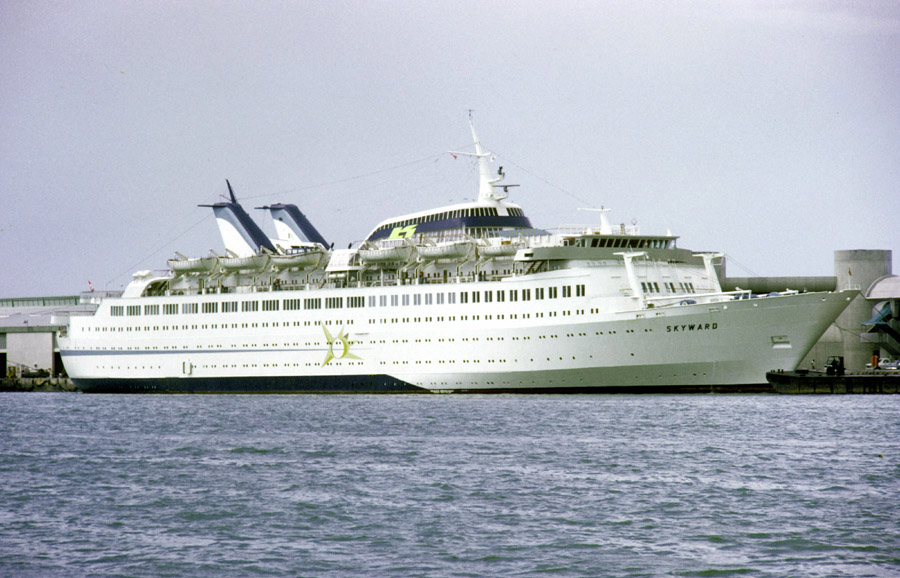
- MS Skyward moored in the PortMiami, 1980

History
- Name: 1969–1991: Skyward; 1991–1992: Shangri-La World; 1992: Asean World; 1992–1993: Fantasy World; 1993–2021: Leisure World
- Operator: 1969–1991: Norwegian Cruise Line; 1991–1995: Johnson Sembawang Shipmanagement; 1995–2000: Queenstown Investments Ltd; 2000–2021: New Century Cruise Line
- Port of registry: 1969–1988: Oslo, Norway; 1988–2006: Nassau, Bahamas; 2006–2012: Funafuti, Tuvalu; 2012–2015: Malakal Harbor, Palau; 2015–2021: Panama, Panama
- Builder: AG Weser Shipyards
- Yard number: 942
- Laid down: December 6, 1968
- Launched: June 26, 1969
- Completed: December 19, 1969
- In service: January 3, 1970
- Out of service: 2021
- Identification: IMO number: 6921828; MMSI number: 374139000; Callsign: 3FNT4
- Fate: Scrapped in Alang, India, 2021

General characteristics
- Tonnage: 16,254 GRT
- Length: 528 ft (161 m)
- Beam: 74 ft (23 m)
- Speed: 16 knots (30 km/h; 18 mph)
- Capacity: 580 (normal); 850 (maximum)
- Crew: 250

MS Skyward (also known as Leisure World) was a cruise ship built in 1969 for Norwegian Cruise Line. It subsequently served for several years under various companies, both as a cruise ship and later on as a floating casino. She was finally sold for scrap in 2021 and beached for demolition at Alang, India.

== History ==
Skyward was delivered on December 10, 1969, along with her sister, Starward, as the first purpose-built ships of Norwegian Cruise Line.

During a cruise in 1973 many passengers became ill due to infected water. In 1979 a boiler room fire broke out on board the Skyward, and consequently her engines had to be stopped and her passengers transferred to the Starward.

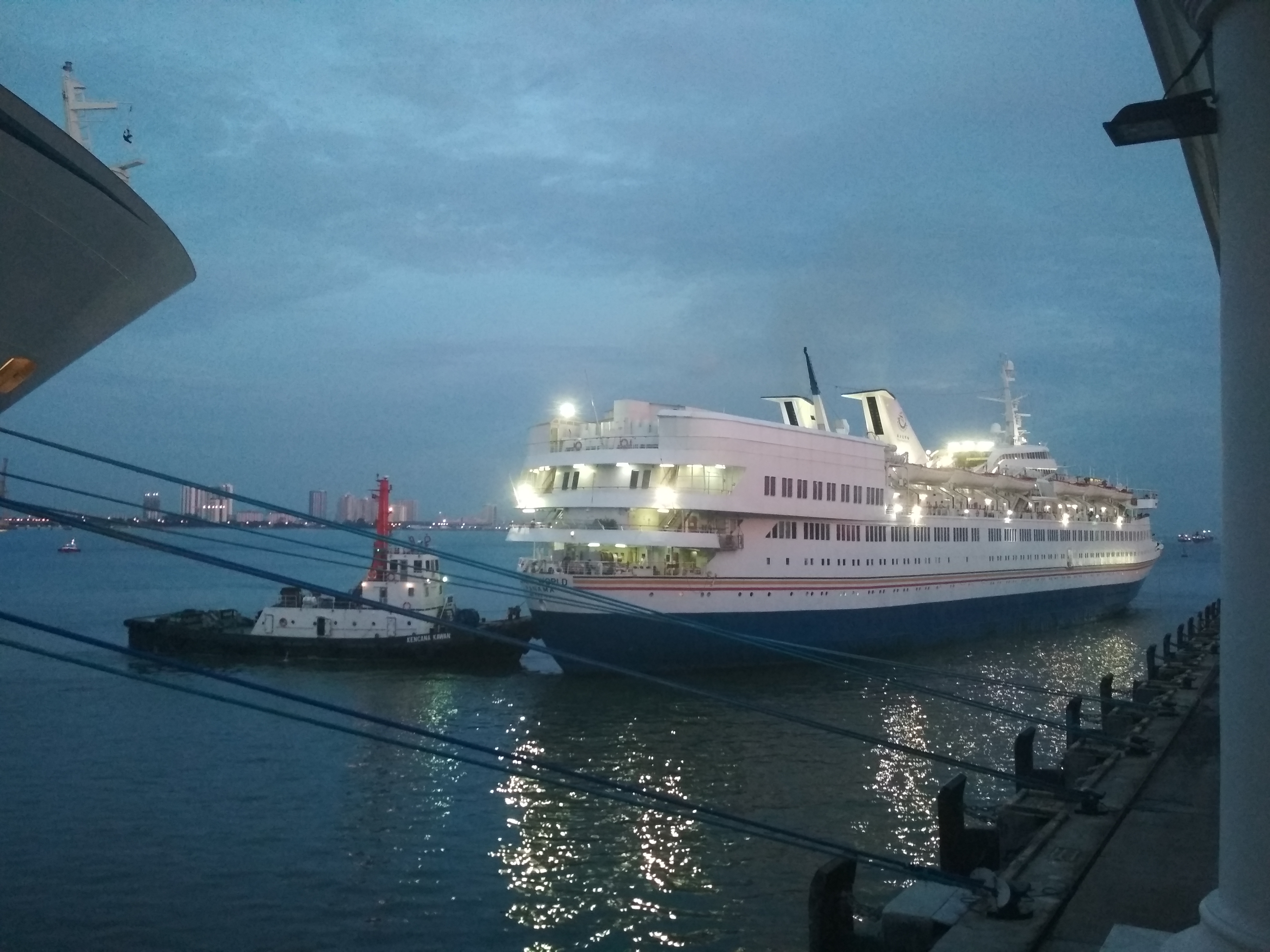
Leisure World in Penang, Malaysia on June 15, 2019

She was operated by her original owners until 1991, when the Skyward was purchased by Johnson Sembawang Shipmanagement in Nassau to become the Shangri-la World. Shangri-la World operated cruises out of Singapore. After going through several name changes in the 1990s, the now renamed Leisure World was rebuilt and renovated in Jacksonville, Florida and sold to Queenstown Investments in 1995. In 2000 she was sold to New Century Cruise Line, who operated her as a casino/entertainment ship out of Penang. As a casino ship, she was one of at least three casino ships (Long Jie (formerly Omar), Royale Star) operating off Batam. Following the opening of the two legal land casinos in Singapore, ship casinos' business suffered badly. As a result, all the casino ships closed down except for Leisure World. In 2014, a new casino ship (Ocean Grand) emerged to compete with Leisure World. Ocean Grand closed down about six months later despite advertisements in The New Paper (a Singapore tabloid). Since then, business picked up at Leisure World.

In April 2021 New Century Group sold the vessel for US$3.59m for scrap to NKD Maritime, with breaking the ship performed in Alang, India. The Leisure World was beached on July 11, 2021.

== On board features ==
Aboard Leisure World there was a karaoke lounge, miniature golf course, sauna, arcade, gift shop, fitness center and hair salon.
