= Norwegian Prima =

Cruise ship

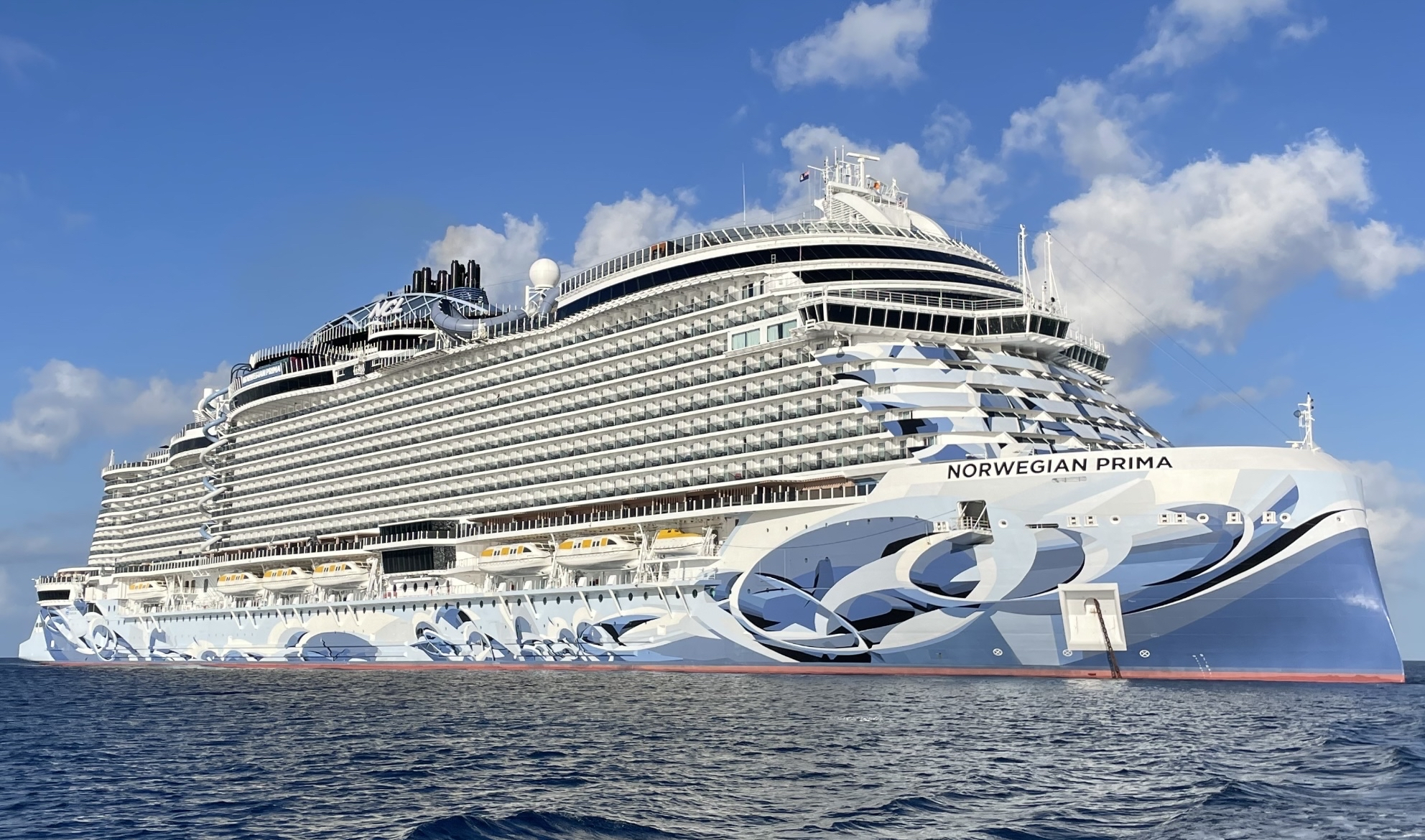
- Norwegian Prima anchored off Grand Cayman, 2023

History

Bahamas
- Name: Norwegian Prima
- Owner: Norwegian Cruise Line Holdings
- Operator: Norwegian Cruise Line
- Port of registry: Nassau, Bahamas
- Ordered: 16 February 2017
- Builder: Fincantieri; Marghera, Italy
- Yard number: 6298
- Laid down: 9 December 2019
- Launched: 13 August 2021
- Sponsored by: Katy Perry
- Christened: 27 August 2022
- Completed: 29 July 2022
- Acquired: 29 July 2022
- In service: 2022–present
- Identification: Call sign: C6FB3; IMO number: 9823986; MMSI number: 311001059
- Status: In service

General characteristics
- Class & type: Prima-class cruise ship
- Tonnage: 143,535 GT
- Length: 299.0 m (981 ft 0 in)
- Beam: 40.5 m (132 ft 10 in) (waterline); 51.0 m (167 ft 4 in) (max)
- Height: 69.3 m (227 ft 4 in)
- Draught: 8.7 m (28 ft 7 in)
- Depth: 11.7 m (38 ft 5 in)
- Propulsion: Diesel-electric; Two units ABB Azipod XO
- Capacity: 3,099 (double occupancy)
- Crew: 1,506

Norwegian Prima is a Prima-class cruise ship operated by Norwegian Cruise Line (NCL). She is the first of six new ships in its class and entered service in August 2022.
