= MV Dreamward =

Ship built in 1992

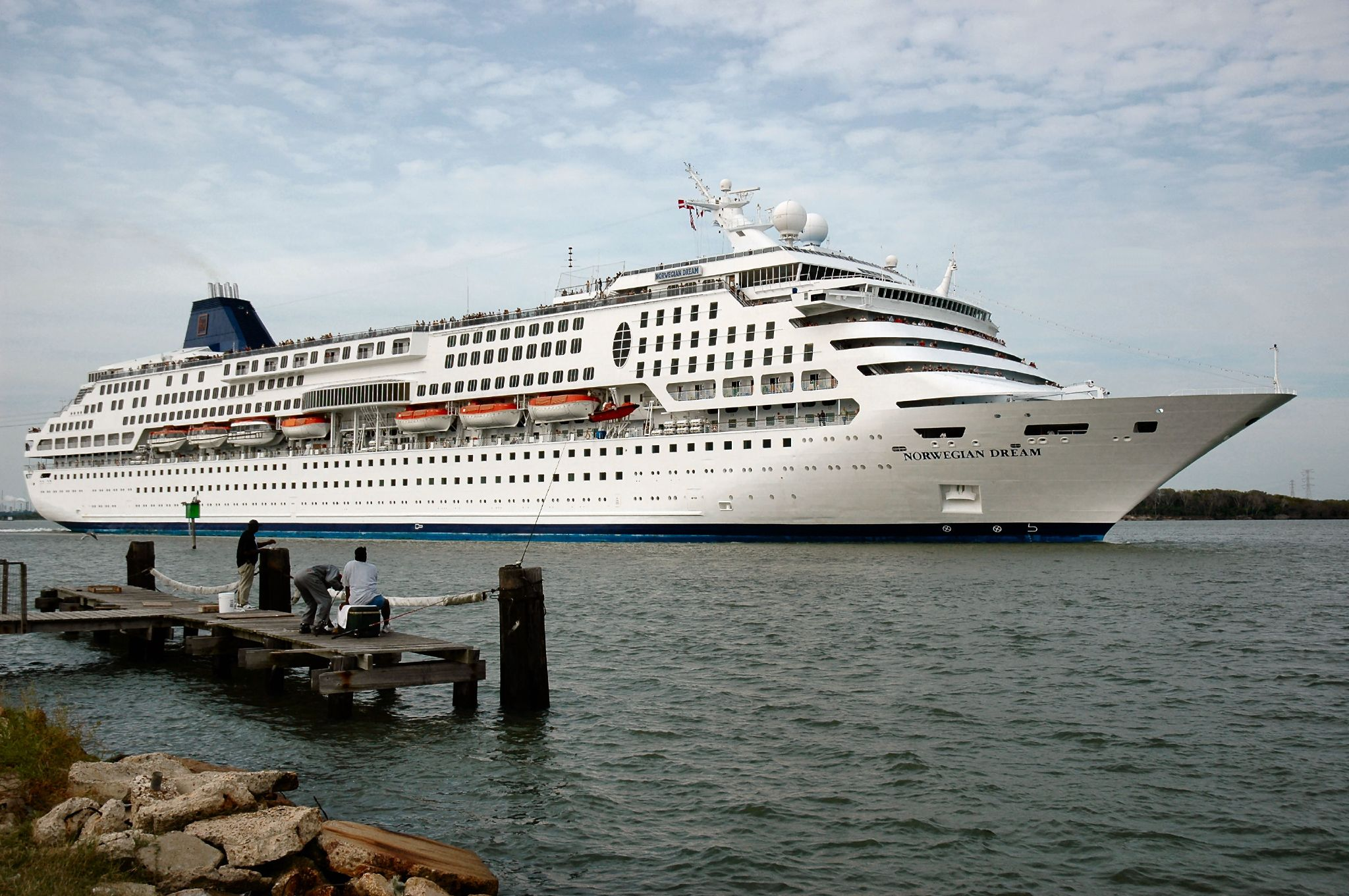
- Norwegian Dream departing Galveston Bay

History
- Name: 1992–1998: Dreamward; 1998–2012: Norwegian Dream; 2012–2022: SuperStar Gemini; 2022: Gem
- Owner: 1993–2004: Norwegian Cruise Line; 2004–2022: Star Cruises
- Operator: Norwegian Cruise Line: 1993–2008; Star Cruises: 2012–2022
- Port of registry: Nassau, Bahamas (until 2022); Saint Kitts and Nevis (2022)
- Builder: Chantiers de l'Atlantique, St. Nazaire, France
- Cost: $240 million
- Yard number: C30
- Laid down: 6 March 1991
- Launched: 24 February 1992
- Christened: 5 December 1992
- Completed: 1992
- Acquired: 4 November 1992
- Maiden voyage: 1992
- In service: 6 December 1992
- Out of service: 2022
- Identification: IMO number: 9008419; MMSI number: 308272000; Callsign: C6LG5
- Fate: Scrapped at Alang, India in 2022

General characteristics (as built)
- Class & type: Dreamward-class cruise ship
- Tonnage: 39,172 GT; 5,589 DWT
- Length: 190.04 m (623 ft 6 in)
- Beam: 28.80 m (94 ft 6 in)
- Draught: 6.80 m (22 ft 4 in)
- Ice class: 1 C
- Installed power: 2 × 8-cylinder, 2 × 6-cylinder MAN-B&W diesels; 18,638 kW (24,994 hp) combined
- Propulsion: 2 × propellers; 2 × bow thrusters
- Speed: 21 knots (38.89 km/h; 24.17 mph)
- Capacity: 1,246 passengers (all berths)

General characteristics (after 1998 refit)
- Tonnage: 50,764 GT; 6,731 DWT
- Length: 229.84 m (754 ft 1 in)
- Beam: 32.10 m (105 ft 4 in)
- Draught: 7.00 m (23 ft 0 in)
- Depth: 17.83 m (58 ft 6 in)
- Decks: 10 (passenger accessible)
- Capacity: 1,750 passengers (lower berths); 2,156 passengers (all berths)
- Crew: 700

MS Dreamward was a cruise ship owned and operated by Star Cruises. She was built in 1992 by the Chantiers de l'Atlantique shipyard in St. Nazaire, France as MS Dreamward for traffic with Norwegian Cruise Line. In 1998 she was lengthened at Lloyd Werft in Bremerhaven, Germany and renamed as Norwegian Dream. In late 2012, she was transferred to the fleet of Star Cruises and renamed SuperStar Gemini.

== History ==
=== Concept and construction ===
Dreamward was the first in a pair of two identical cruise ships ordered by Kloster Cruise for Norwegian Cruise Line (NCL) from Chantiers de l'Atlantique. The sisters were planned with a gross tonnage of approximately 40,000, and maximum passenger capacity of 1,246 persons. However, they were also designed from the start with the concept of lengthening in mind, making it possible for the company to easily expand their capacity without having to order entirely new ships.

The lengthening was eventually carried out in March–May 1998 at Lloyd Werft in Bremerhaven, Germany, where the ship was cut in half and a new 40-metre (131 ft 3 in) midsection was inserted. In addition to the lengthening, the ship's funnel and radar mast were adapted so that they could be folded down, allowing her to pass under the bridges of the Kiel Canal. Coinciding with the lengthening, Dreamward was renamed Norwegian Dream. She re-emerged at 50,764 GT and with maximum passenger capacity of 2,156. A documentary film about the lengthening has been broadcast by ARTE Television on 19 January 1999.

=== Service history ===
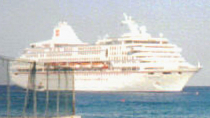
Dreamward at Grand Cayman

Dreamward was delivered on 4 November 1992. She was named on 5 December 1992 at Port Everglades, Florida, and started on her first cruise to Bermuda the following day. Subsequently, the ship was used for cruising from New York to the Bahamas and from Florida to the Caribbean. Her sister ship was a year later named as Windward. Originally both Dreamward and Windward carried the early-1990s NCL livery with a white funnel and red and blue decorative stripes on the hull. Sometime before 1998 they received the new NCL livery with a dark blue funnel and an all-white hull.

Dreamward made a brief cameo in David Foster Wallace's 1995 Harper's magazine essay "Shipping Out: On the (nearly lethal) comforts of a luxury cruise", when the ship Wallace was travelling on, the Zenith, docked alongside Dreamward in Cozumel. Wallace expresses his amazement at the scale of Dreamward as it docks, and at what he perceives as its relatively impressive appearance compared to the Zenith.

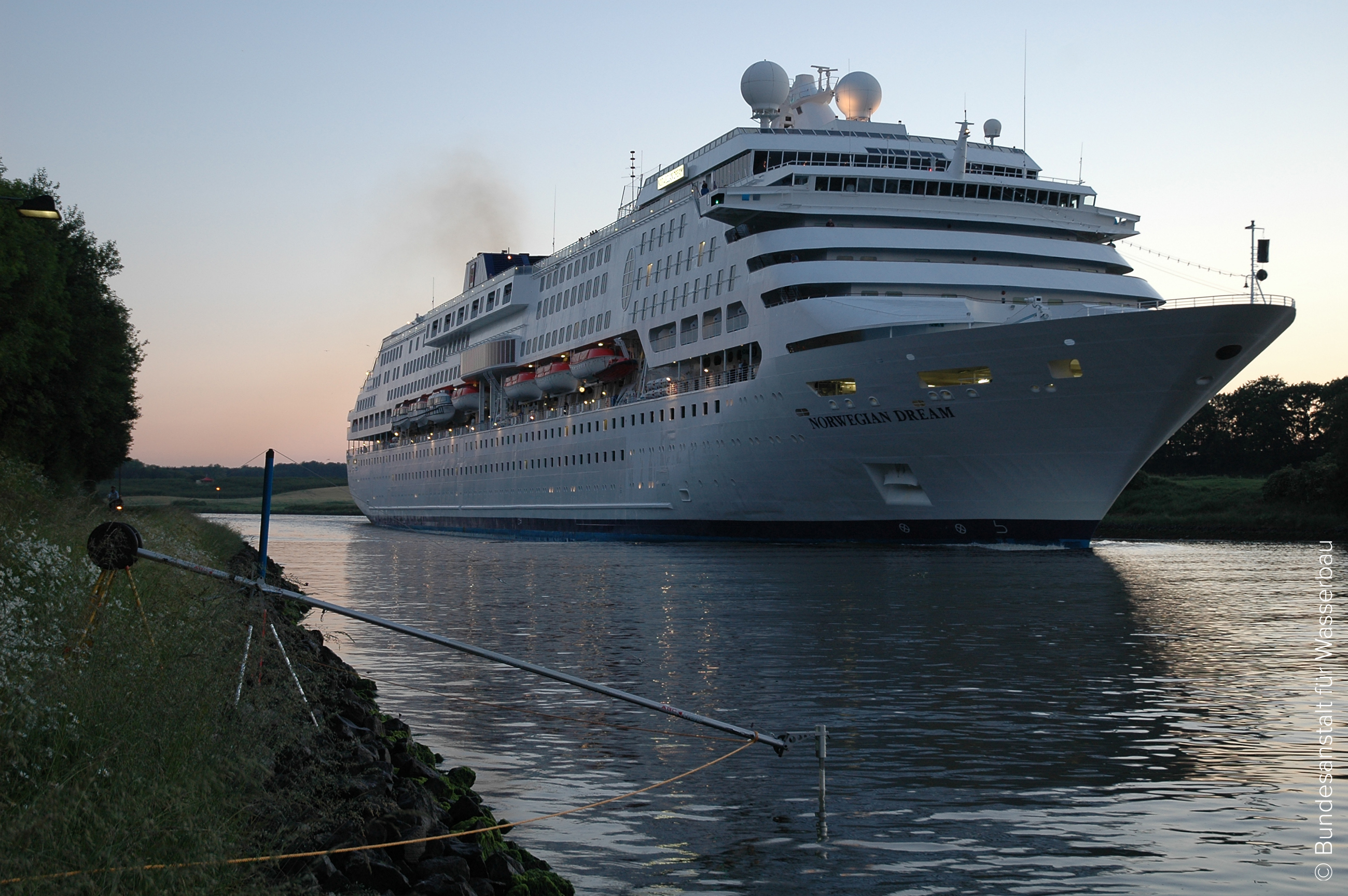
Norwegian Dream at Kiel Canal

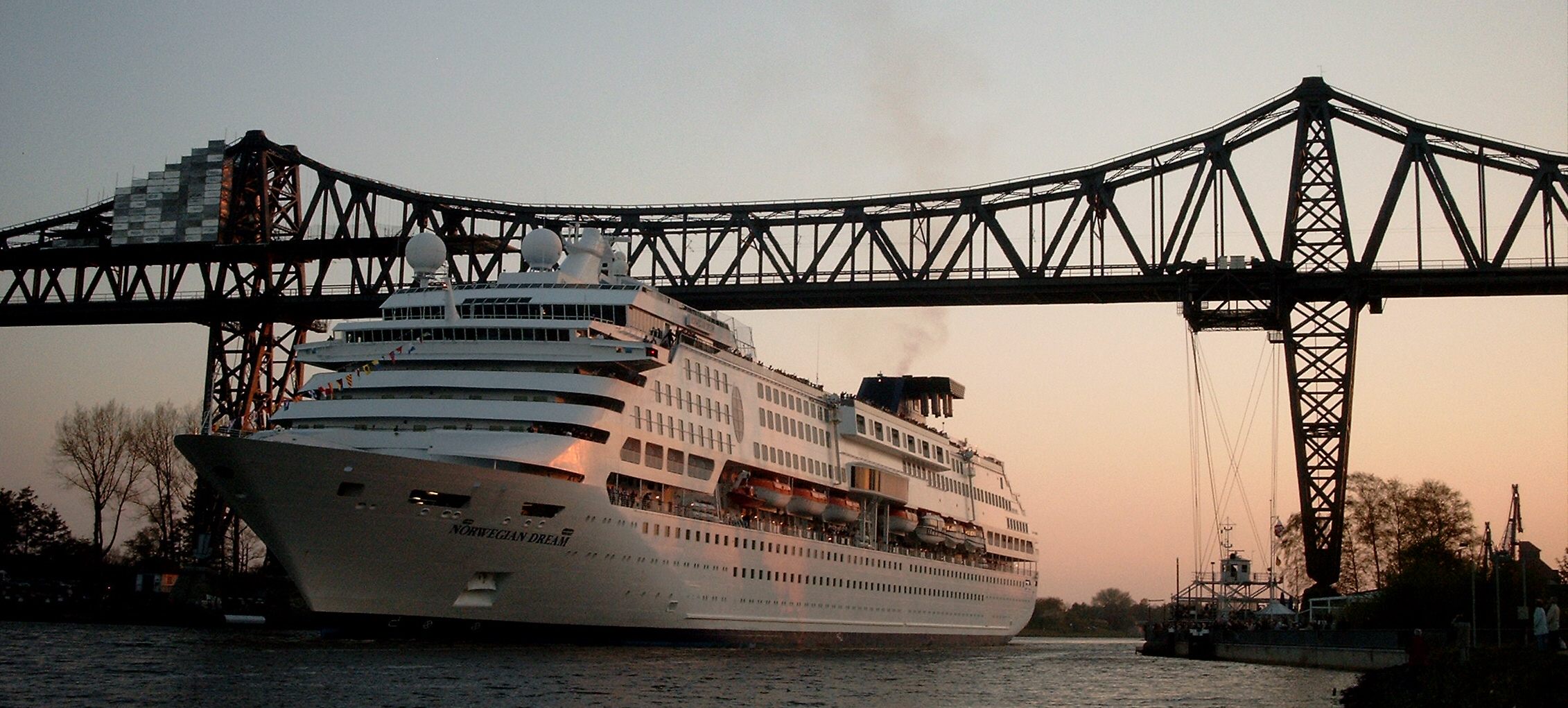
Norwegian Dream

Afterwards, she was also used for cruising around Europe. On 24 August 1999, Norwegian Dream was involved in a collision with the container ship Ever Decent (IMO 9134244) while en route from Zeebrügge, Belgium to Dover, England. Although her bow was damaged, Norwegian Dream continued to Dover under her own power. The IMO report states that the weather at the time was good with a slight sea and good visibility. Ever Decent was severely damaged, eventually listing 40 degrees to port. As a result of the collision Ever Decent caught fire and a toxic plume formed. The cargo her included all IMO hazmat classes except explosives, in particular, two containers of cyanide were a concern. Following the incident, Norwegian Dream was repaired at Lloyd Werft.

In 2004 the ownership of Norwegian Dream was transferred to NCL's parent company Star Cruises, in preparation for possible sale or transfer to the Star Cruises fleet. On 10 December 2007, the cruise ship was involved in a further collision with a barge while leaving the port of Montevideo, Uruguay. The collision caused some damage above the waterline that did not appear to be serious. The collision caused several cars and five containers to fall off the barge, which closed the port for some time.

On 23 April 2008 Star Cruises entered an agreement to sell Norwegian Dream, as well as her fleet mate Norwegian Majesty, to the Cyprus-based Louis Cruise Lines, which was reportedly willing to pay $218 million for the ship. International Shipping Partners was also interested in Norwegian Dream. Louis was supposed to pay the entire $218 million upon the ship's delivery, but by 29 September 2008, when the ship should have been delivered to Louis, they canceled the deal due to "technical issues relating to the vessel." The deal for Norwegian Majesty, however, was completed in July. In November 2008 Norwegian Dream was laid up in Freeport, Bahamas awaiting a buyer.. The ship had a brief spell in the port of Piraeus, Greece, before relocating to Kalamata on 13 June 2011 for inspection by Louis Cruise Lines and Pullmantur Cruises. Shortly thereafter, she returned to the anchor point off Piraeus. Later, on the move yet again, Norwegian Dream was sighted at anchor in Singapore Harbour in June 2011. Star Cruises confirmed that the vessel was in Singapore for a technical dry-dock. She was also seen anchored in the harbour in Penang, Malaysia, in May 2012.

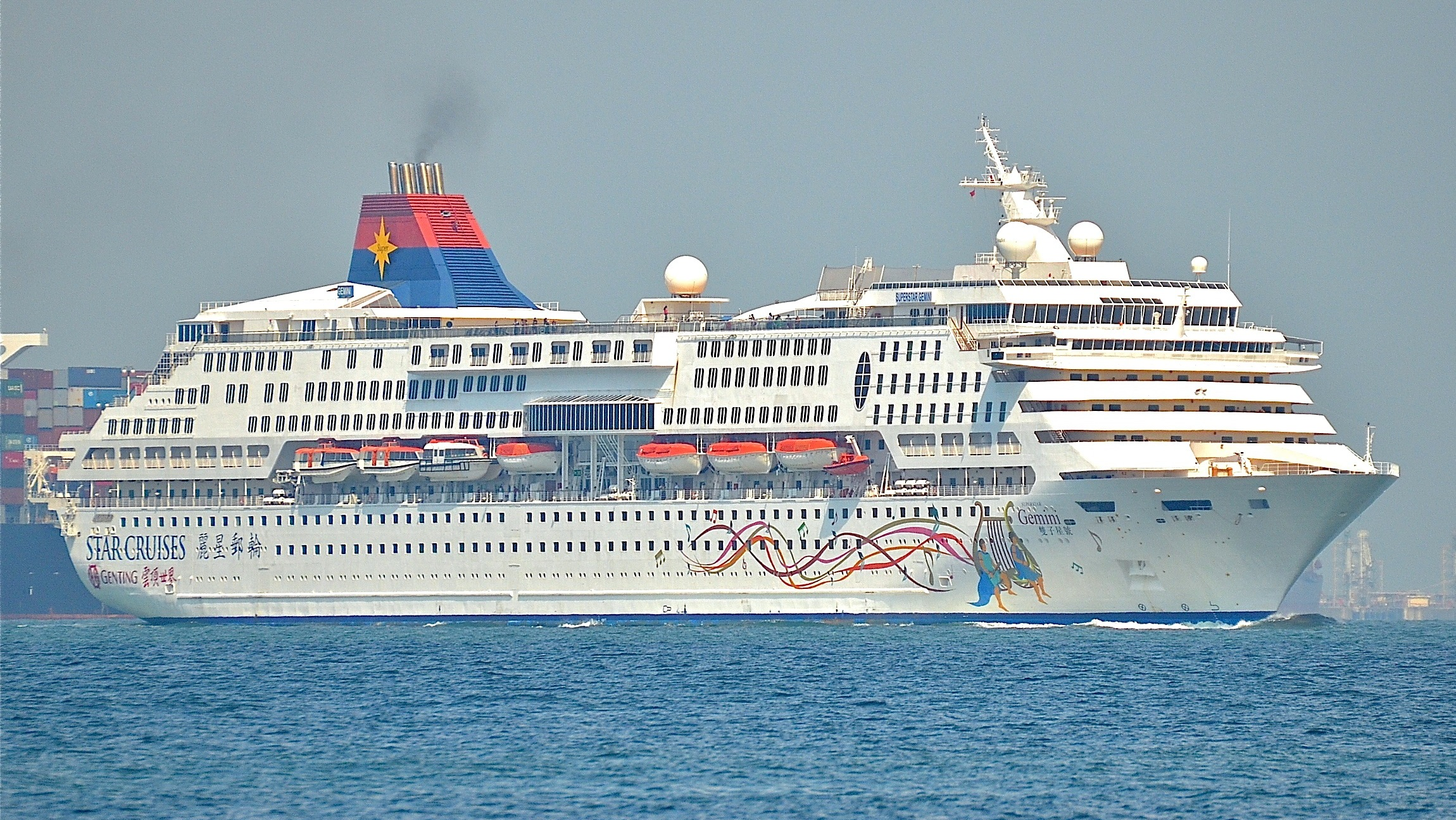
SuperStar Gemini in 2014

On 10 September 2012, Star Cruises announced that it would refurbish Norwegian Dream, and rename the ship to SuperStar Gemini. The refurbished SuperStar Gemini now housed new onboard facilities including restaurants of Chinese, Asian and international cuisines, open-deck barbecue, show lounge, karaoke, spa & health club, beauty salon, children's playroom and swimming pool. With a passenger capacity of 1,532, the vessel houses 766 guest cabins in a variety of layouts including ergonomic oceanview rooms, junior suites and deluxe executive suites. The estimated cost of this refurbishment was US$50 million.

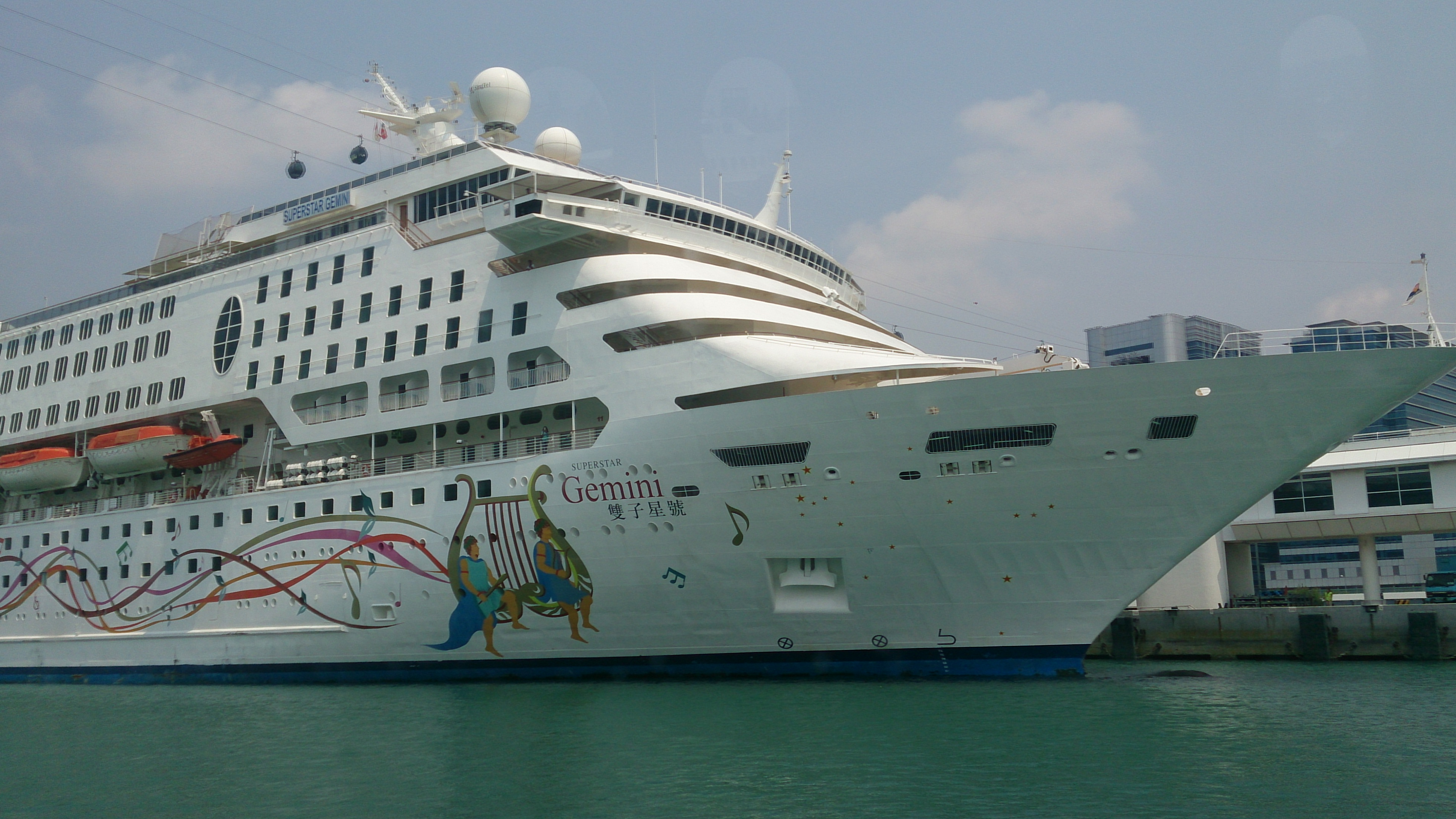
SuperStar Gemini

On 27 November 2016, while cruising to Penang, CCTV footage on SuperStar Gemini showed that a Singaporean man fell overboard 9.5 nautical miles (17.6 km; 10.9 mi) off Pulau Besar and 12 nautical miles (22 km; 14 mi) off Tanjung Kling. He was reported missing after he failed to respond to the ship's announcements before the ship docked in Georgetown, Penang.

In April 2022, it was announced that SuperStar Gemini along with SuperStar Aquarius and Star Pisces were all sold for scrap, following the collapse of Star Cruises' parent company, Genting Hong Kong. On 29 May 2022, the ship departed from Penang as Gem with flag Saint Kitts and Nevis for scrap in India.
