= Norwegian Viva =

Cruise ship

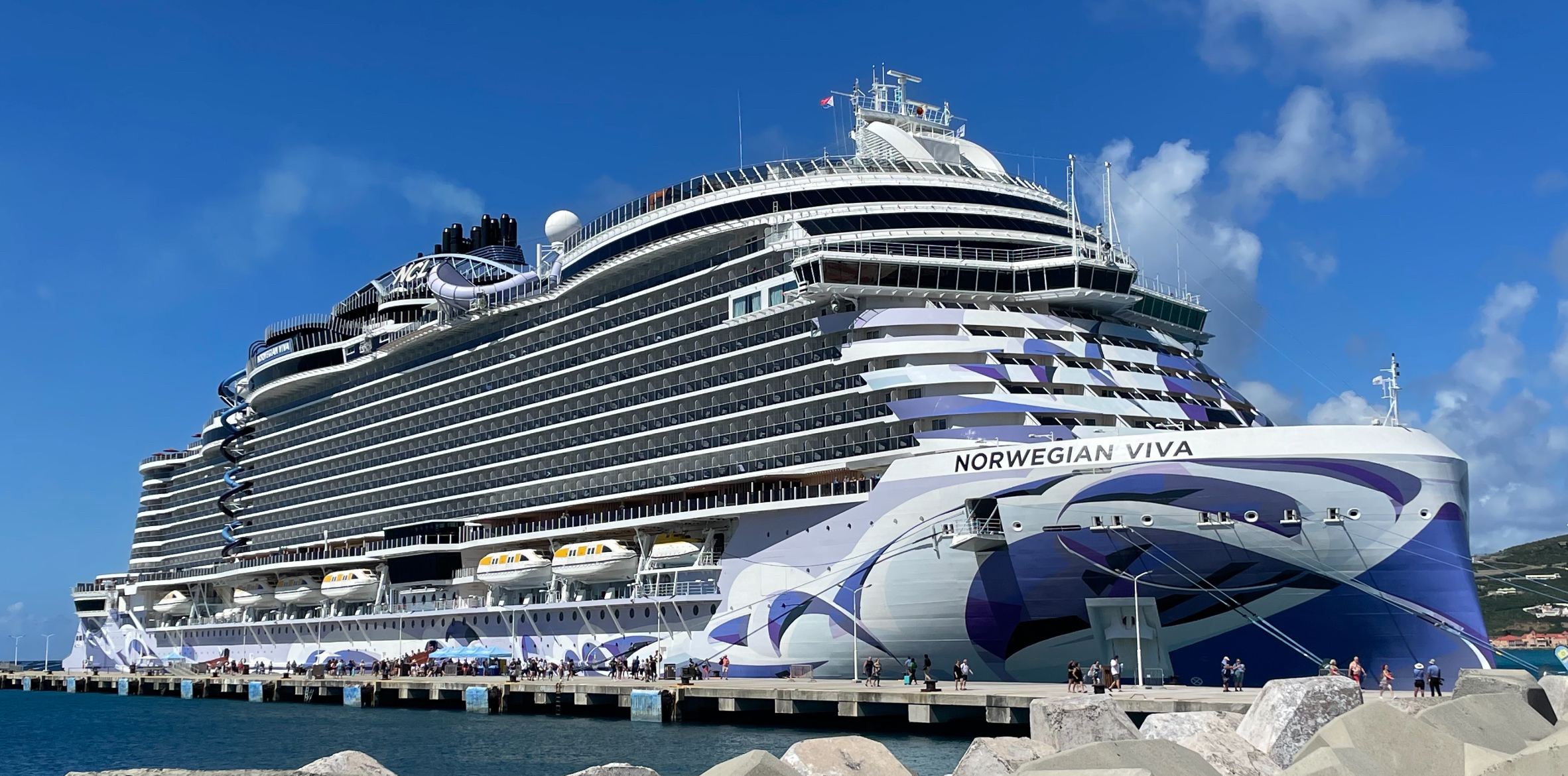
- Norwegian Viva docked at St. Maarten on 1 March 2024.

History

Bahamas
- Name: Norwegian Viva
- Owner: Norwegian Cruise Line Holdings
- Operator: Norwegian Cruise Line
- Port of registry: Nassau, Bahamas
- Ordered: 16 February 2017
- Builder: Fincantieri; Marghera, Italy
- Yard number: 6299
- Laid down: 9 December 2019
- Launched: 2 August 2022
- Sponsored by: Luis Fonsi
- Christened: 28 November 2023 (planned)
- Acquired: 3 August 2023
- Maiden voyage: 10 August 2023
- Identification: IMO number: 9823998; MMSI number: 311001127; Call sign: C6FJ9
- Status: In service

General characteristics
- Class & type: Prima-class cruise ship
- Tonnage: 143,535 GT
- Length: 299 m (981 ft 0 in)
- Beam: 40.5 m (132 ft 10 in) (moulded)
- Height: 69.3 m (227 ft 4 in)
- Draught: 8.7 m (28 ft 7 in)
- Depth: 11.7 m (38 ft 5 in)
- Propulsion: Diesel-electric; Two units ABB Azipod XO
- Capacity: 3,215 lower beds

Norwegian Viva is a Prima-class cruise ship of Norwegian Cruise Line. She is the second out of six Prima-class ships in the Norwegian Cruise Line fleet. Norwegian took delivery of the ship on 3 August 2023 and held her maiden voyage one week later.

== History ==
Norwegian Cruise Line ordered four ships under Project Leonardo in February 2017, which included Norwegian Viva. The ship was christened at Miami in November 2023.

On December 15, 2023, the Autoridad de los Puertos de Puerto Rico welcomed Norwegian Viva to her home port in San Juan, Puerto Rico. Itineraries departing from San Juan will make stops throughout the Caribbean on various 7-day cruises between December 2023 and March 2024. Departures will begin from the Pan American Pier in Old San Juan. Prior to arriving in Puerto Rico, the ship was baptized by the godfather of the ship, Luis Fonsi.
