= SuperStar Gemini =

A number of ships have been named SuperStar Gemini, including -

- SuperStar Gemini (1995) - a cruise liner launched in 1991 as Crown Jewel she carried the name SuperStar Gemini between 1995 and 2009
- SuperStar Gemini (2012) - a cruise liner launched in 1992 as Dreamward, renamed Norwegian Dream in 1998 and SuperStar Gemini in 2012
