= Norwegian Aqua =

Cruise ship owned by Norwegian Cruise Line

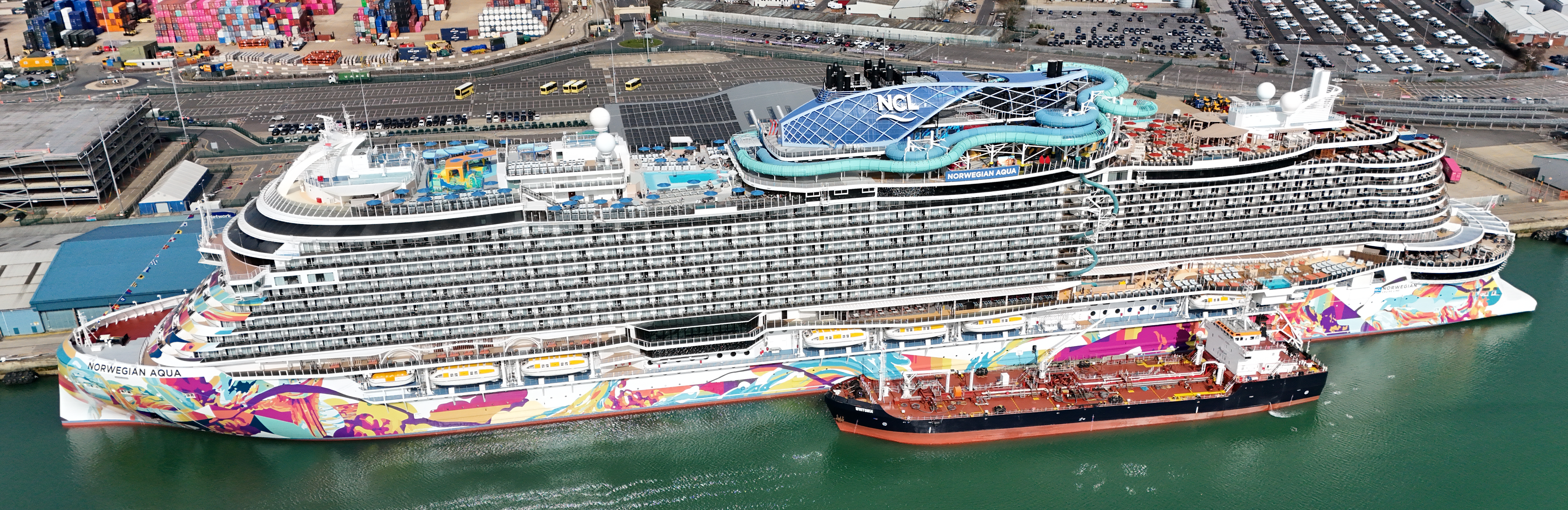
- Norwegian Aqua in Southampton

History

Bahamas
- Name: Norwegian Aqua
- Owner: Norwegian Cruise Line
- Port of registry: Nassau, Bahamas
- Builder: Fincantieri, Marghera
- Sponsored by: Eric Stonestreet
- Christened: April 14, 2025
- In service: 2025–present
- Status: In service

General characteristics
- Class & type: Prima-class cruise ship
- Tonnage: 156,300 GT
- Length: 1,056 ft (322 m)
- Beam: 41 m
- Capacity: 3,571
- Crew: 1597

Norwegian Aqua is a cruise ship operated by Norwegian Cruise Line of the Prima Plus class, the debut ship of its subclass.

== History ==
In 2017, Norwegian Cruise Line ordered four ships of a novel class, scheduled for delivery from 2022 to 2025. Norwegian Aqua's maiden voyage was from the Fincantieri shipyard to Southampton. The ship's first sail across the Atlantic was originally intended to be from Southampton to Boston, but was diverted to New York City due to inclement weather.

Eric Stonestreet christened Norwegian Aqua on April 13, 2025, at Miami.

=== Service history ===
For the 2026 season, Norwegian Aqua is scheduled for 28 visits of Bermuda.

== Design ==
Norwegian Aqua departing from NYC on September 8, 2026

Norwegian Aqua is 10% larger than other ships of the Prima class, being the first of the Prima Plus subclass. In addition to Prima-class features, Norwegian Aqua also has a slidecoaster (a hybrid between a water slide and roller coaster), digital sport complex, arcade, and an adults-only club. Riders on the slidecoaster can reach around 31 mph (50 km/h) and experience 0.8 g of force. There are seventeen restaurants and eighteen bars on Norwegian Aqua. The external art of the ship was designed by Allison Hueman.
