= Prima-class cruise ship =

Class of cruise ships built for Norwegian Cruise Line

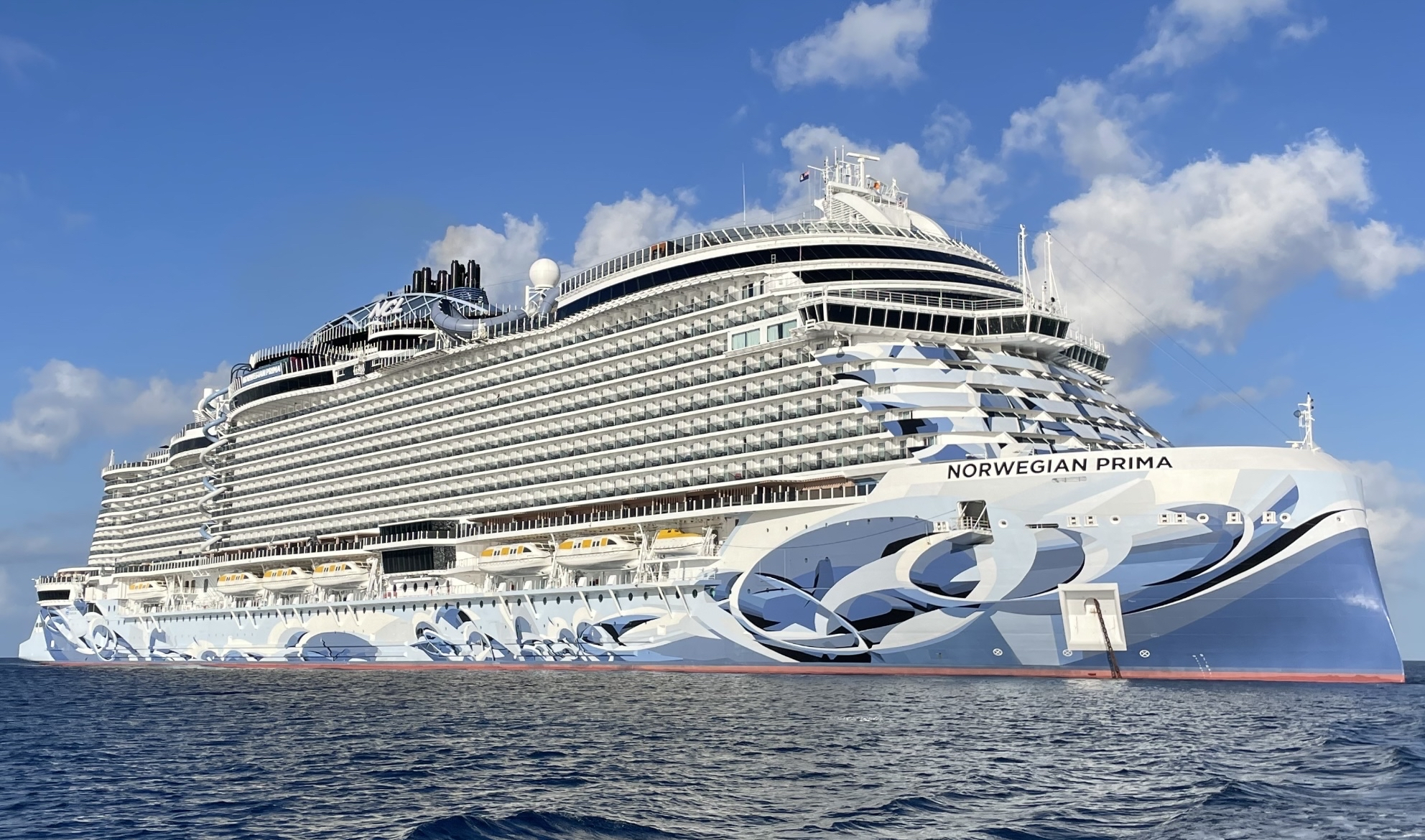
- Norwegian Prima, the lead vessel of the Prima class

Class overview
- Builders: Fincantieri
- Operators: Norwegian Cruise Line
- Preceded by: Breakaway class
- Subclasses: Prima-plus class; Prima-plus plus class
- Planned: 6
- Building: 2
- Completed: 4
- Active: 4

General characteristics
- Type: Cruise ship
- Tonnage: 142,500−172,000 GT
- Length: 300 m (984 ft 3 in) - 344 m (1,128 ft 7 in)
- Height: 69.3 m (227 ft 4 in)
- Capacity: 3,195–3,840

Prima-class cruise ships (/ˈpriːmɑː/, PREE-mah), formerly known by the project name Project Leonardo, are a class of cruise ships built for Norwegian Cruise Line (NCL). These are the first NCL ships to be built by Fincantieri. Each ship is expected to cost about $850 million. The modifications that are to be made to the design of the future Prima-class ships would result in an extra 1.2 billion euros in shipbuilding costs — about US$1.27 billion.

The first ship, Norwegian Prima, entered service in 2022, with the second, Norwegian Viva, in 2023.

The third ship Norwegian Aqua, the first in the Prima plus subclass entered the fleet in 2025 and was around 10 percent bigger in gross tonnage than the Norwegian Prima. The fourth Prima plus class ship, Norwegian Luna debuted in March 2026.

The upcoming fifth ship Norwegian Aura and sixth ship Norwegian Bella will be Prima plus plus subclass ships and will be 20 percent larger than Norwegian Prima, making them the largest in the entire fleet, and they will debut in 2027 and 2028. The Prima plus plus ships will be wider and longer than Norwegian Prima.

== History ==
Norwegian Cruise Line (NCL) ordered four ships in February 2017, with an option for two more ships, under the project name "Project Leonardo". The ships should be delivered in the years 2022 to 2026, the optional ships up to 2028.

In July 2018, the cruise line confirmed its order for the fifth and sixth cruise ships under Project Leonardo. They are expected to join the NCL's fleet in 2026 and 2027 respectively.

== Ships ==
Built	Ship	Tonnage	Flag	Notes	Image
Prima class
2022	Norwegian Prima	142,500 GT	Bahamas		
2023	Norwegian Viva	142,500 GT	Bahamas		
Prima-plus class
2025	Norwegian Aqua	156,300 GT	Bahamas	Launched in April 2024; Delivered in March 2025; Entered service in March 2025	
2026	Norwegian Luna	156,300 GT	Bahamas	delivered in March 2026	
Prima-plus plus class
2027	Norwegian Aura	172,000			
2028	Norwegian Bella	172,000			
