= MS Windward =

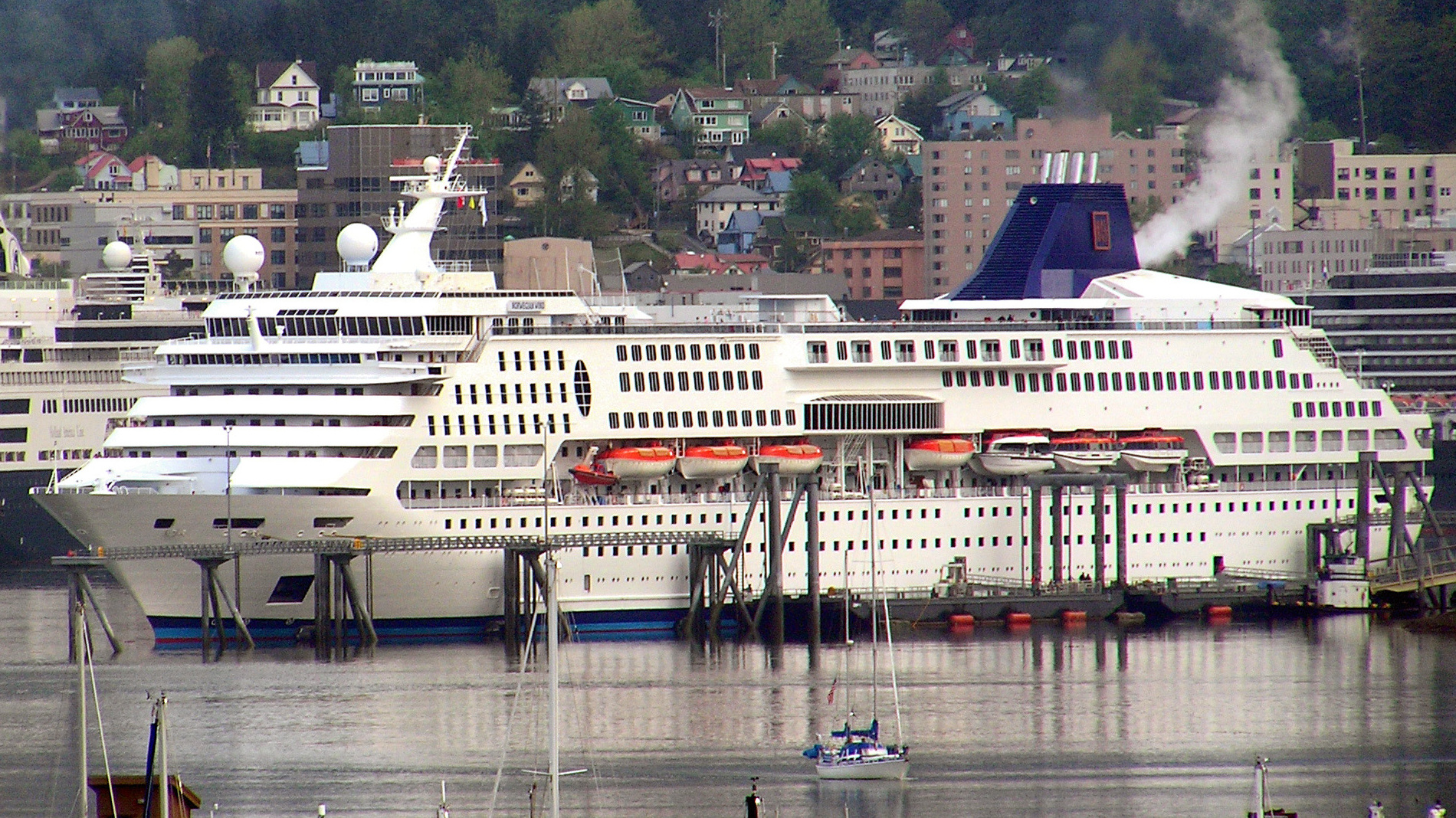
- Norwegian Wind at Juneau, Alaska.

History
- Name: 1993–1998: Windward; 1998–2007: Norwegian Wind; 2007–2022: SuperStar Aquarius; 2022: Arius
- Owner: 1993–1998: Kloster Cruise; 1998–2004: Norwegian Cruise Line; 2004–2022: Star Cruises
- Operator: 1993–2007: Norwegian Cruise Line; 2007–2022: Star Cruises
- Port of registry: Nassau, Bahamas (until 2022); Saint Kitts and Nevis (2022)
- Builder: Chantiers de l'Atlantique, St. Nazaire, France
- Cost: $240 million
- Yard number: D30
- Laid down: 16 December 1991
- Launched: 14 November 1992
- Completed: 1993
- Acquired: 4 May 1993
- Maiden voyage: 1993
- In service: 14 May 1993
- Out of service: 2020
- Identification: IMO number: 9008421; MMSI number: 308273000; Callsign: C6LG6
- Fate: Scrapped at Alang, India in 2022.

General characteristics (as built)
- Class & type: Dreamward-class cruise ship
- Tonnage: 39,127 GT; 4,800 DWT
- Length: 190.04 m (623 ft 6 in)
- Beam: 28.85 m (94 ft 8 in)
- Draught: 7.00 m (23 ft 0 in)
- Ice class: 1 C
- Installed power: MAN diesel engines; 18,480 kW
- Propulsion: Twin propellers; 3 thrusters (2 bow, 1 stern)
- Speed: 20 knots (37 km/h; 23 mph) (service)
- Capacity: 1,246 passengers (all berths)

General characteristics (as Superstar Aquarius)
- Tonnage: 51,309 GT; 6,731 DWT
- Length: 229.84 m (754 ft 1 in)
- Beam: 32.10 m (105 ft 4 in)
- Draught: 7.01 m (23 ft 0 in)
- Depth: 9.66 m (31 ft 8 in)
- Decks: 10 (passenger accessible)
- Speed: 18 knots (33 km/h; 21 mph) (service); 21 knots (39 km/h; 24 mph) (maximum)
- Capacity: 1,750 passengers (lower berths); 2,156 passengers (all berths)
- Crew: 700

MS Windward was a cruise ship that was built in 1993 by the Chantiers de l'Atlantique shipyard in St. Nazaire, France for Kloster Cruise (Norwegian Cruise Line) as Windward. In 1998 she was lengthened at Lloyd Werft in Bremerhaven, Germany and renamed Norwegian Wind. In 2007 she was transferred to the fleet of Star Cruises as SuperStar Aquarius. The ship remained in passenger service for the cruise line until the COVID-19 pandemic shutdown in 2020. The ship was sold for scrap as Arius in 2022 following the liquidation of the cruise line's parent company after filing for bankruptcy, which also led to the demise of Star Cruises.

== History ==
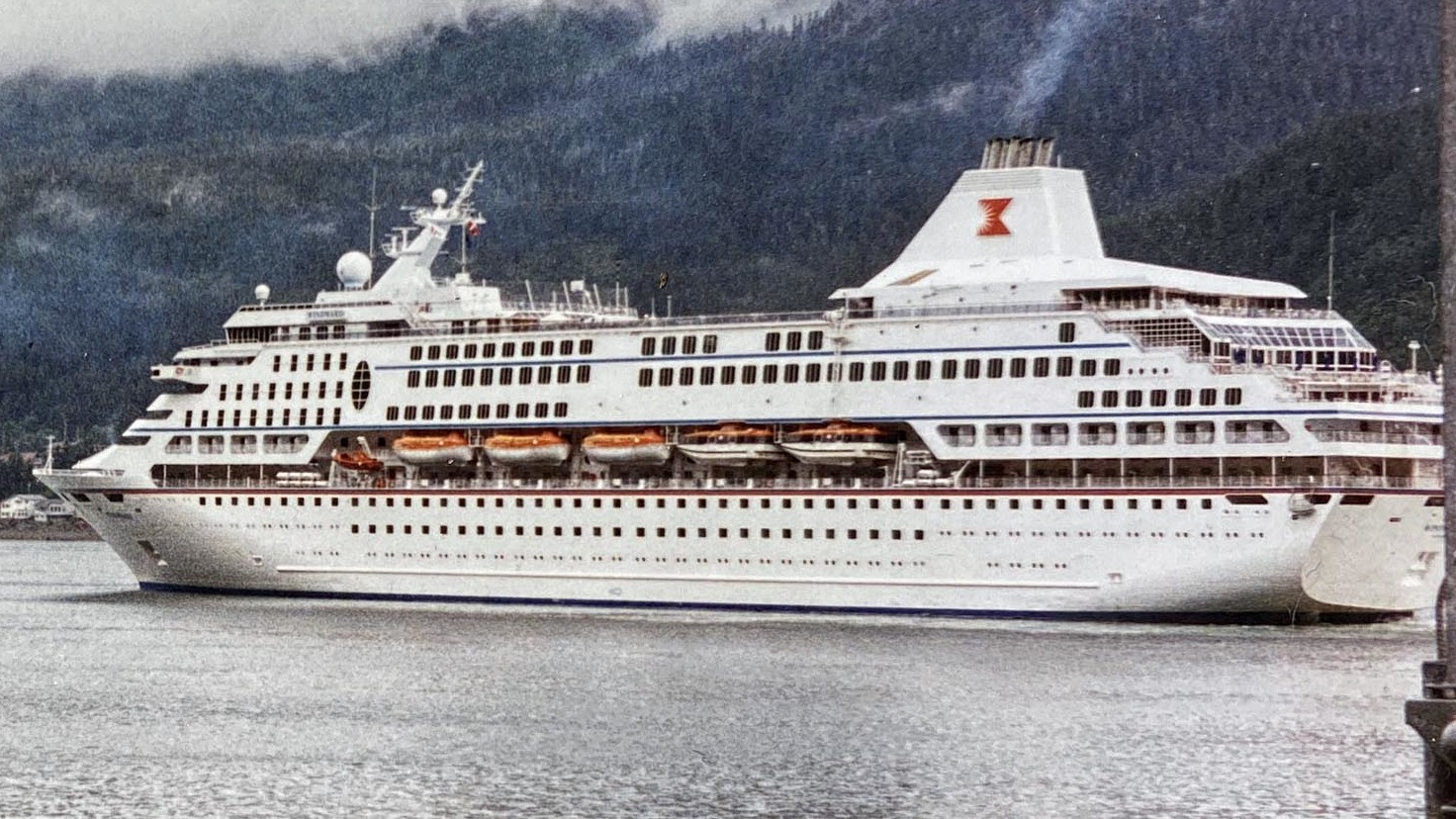
Windward at Juneau, Alaska.

Entering service in 1993 as Windward, she was the second of two sister vessels built by Chantiers de l'Atlantique for Kloster Cruise for use under their Norwegian Cruise Line brand. In 1998 she was lengthened by insertion of a 130-foot (40 m) midsection and was renamed as Norwegian Wind. This work was completed by Lloyd Werft shipyard in Bremerhaven, Germany.

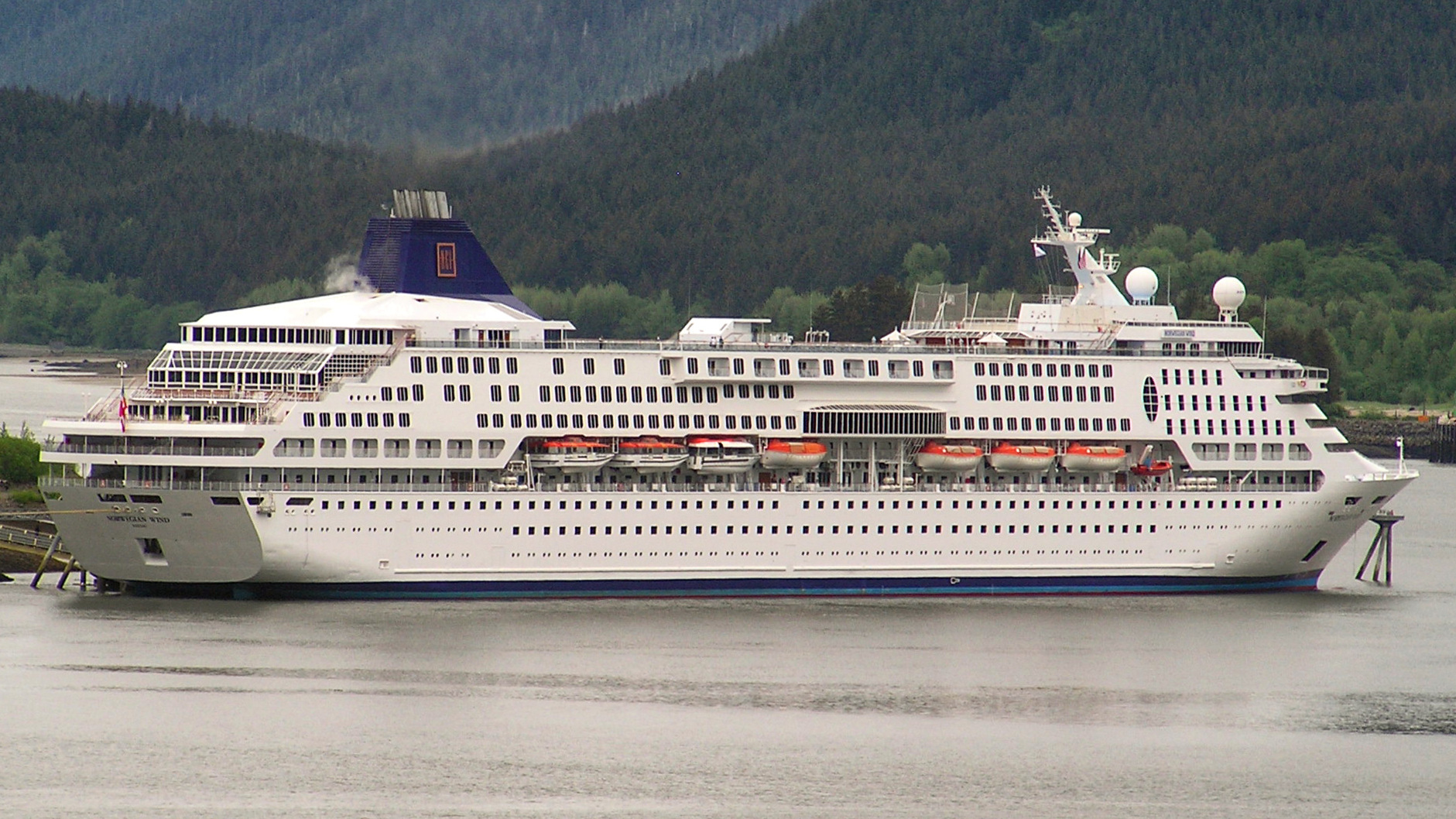
Norwegian Wind in Juneau, Alaska.

One of her early cruises was a private charter for Prudential Assurance of the UK. In January 1995 a 5-day cruise of the Caribbean was undertaken for the top 350 salespeople in the UK Direct Sales Force and their partners. For the booking the cruise liner had additional wording placed below her name on hull and funnel – 'Salute to the Stars' (The Prudential Sales force competition).

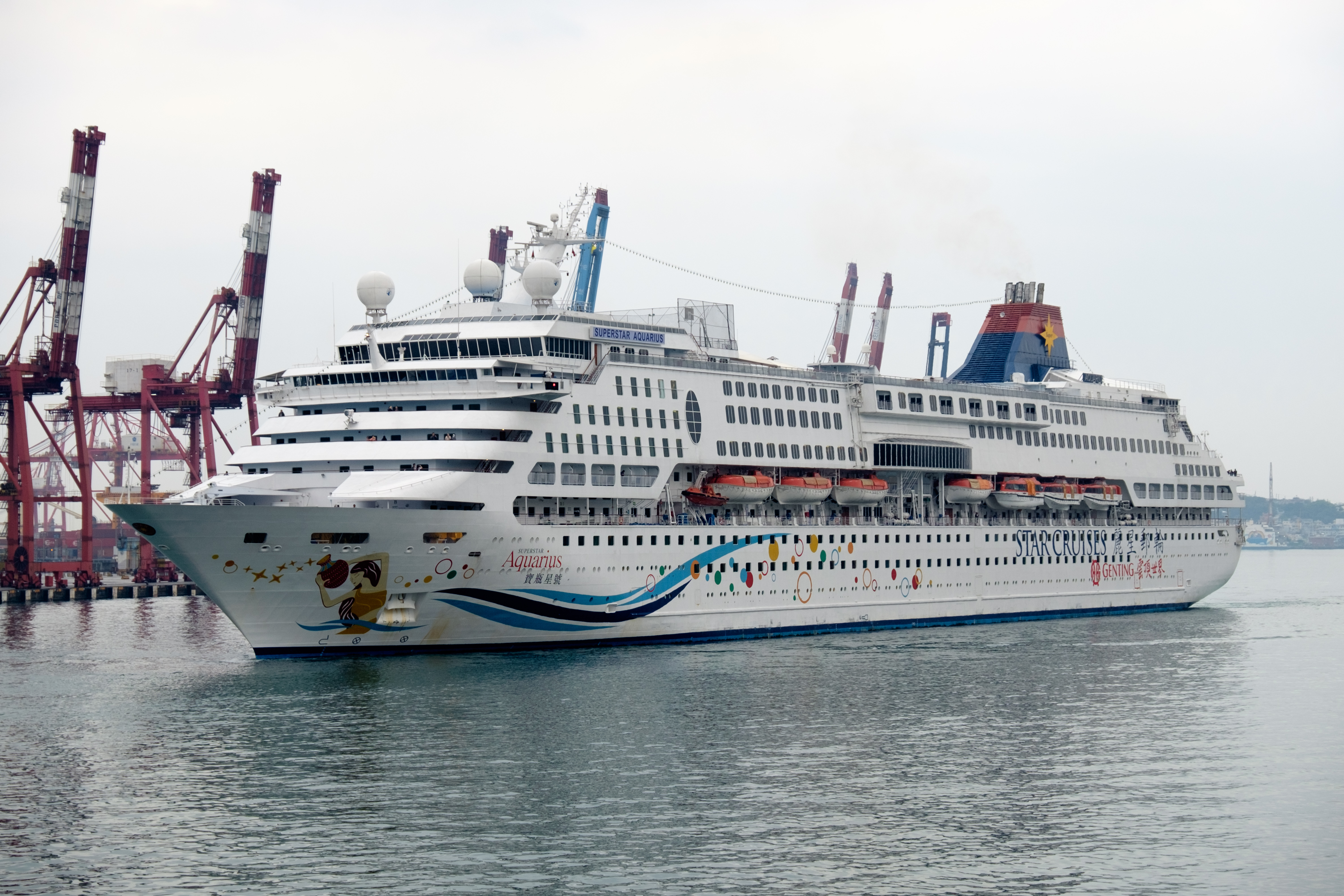
SuperStar Aquarius in Port of Keelung, 2017.

In 2004 ownership of Norwegian Wind was transferred to NCL's parent company Star Cruises, in anticipation of transference of the ship to the Star Cruises' fleet. The transfer took place in April 2007, when the ship was renamed SuperStar Aquarius. After refitting and refurbishment of the public areas to cater to the Asia-Pacific market, as well as a new livery to match the rest of the Star Cruises fleet, the vessel was initially based at the Ocean Terminal, Hong Kong. Subsequently, she was based at various ports in the region. The ship continued to sail for the cruise line until early 2020 when the COVID-19 pandemic halted the cruise line industry, and in April was, with SuperStar Gemini, leased to the Singapore Government to provide accommodation for foreign workers who had recovered from COVID-19.

In January 2022, Genting Hong Kong, the parent company of Star Cruises filed for bankruptcy caused by the shutdown. As part of the liquidation, Superstar Aquarius was reported to have been sold for scrap along with sister ship SuperStar Gemini, as well as Star Pisces. In June the ship was laid up with SuperStar Gemini at Hambantota, Sri Lanka, until both ships departed for Alang shipbreaking yard, India, where they were beached on 26 November 2022.
