= Norwegian Luna =

Cruise ship owned by Norwegian Cruise Line

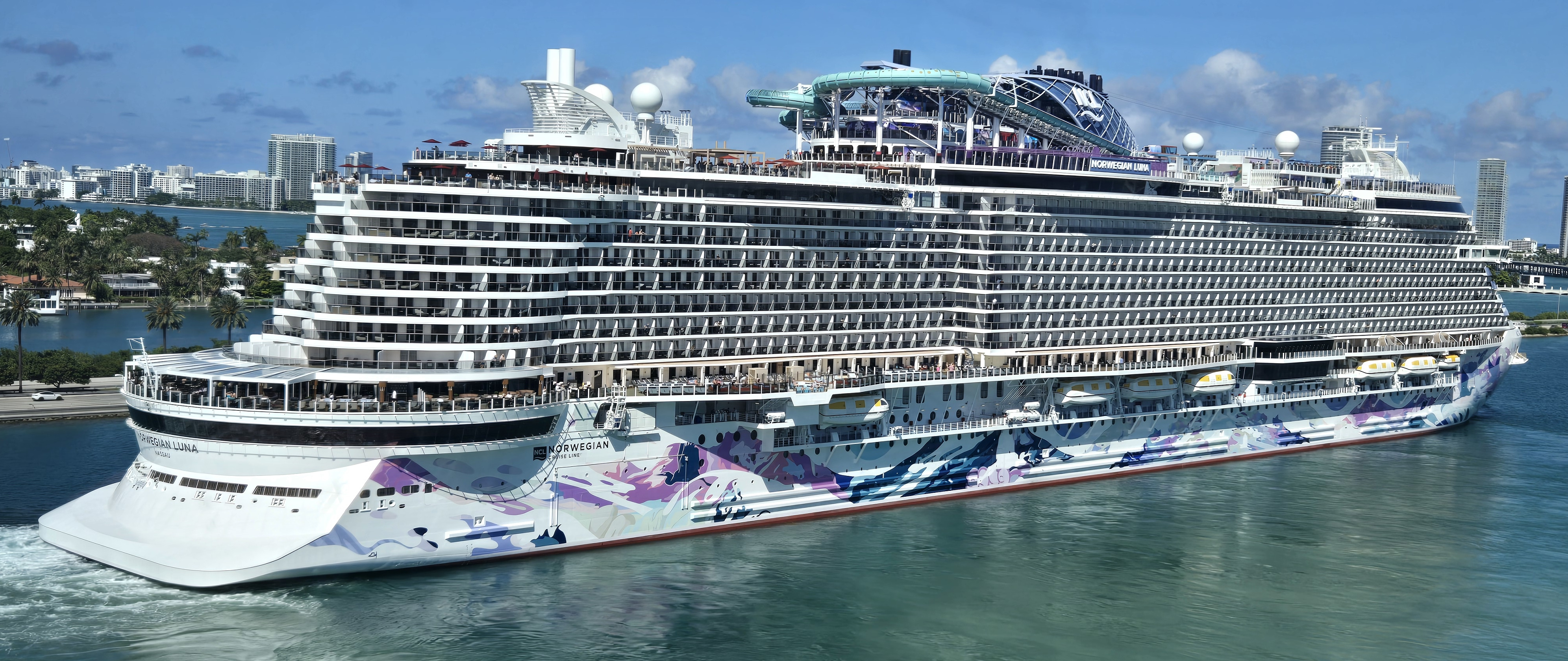
- Norwegian Luna leaving PortMiami

History

Bahamas
- Name: Norwegian Luna
- Owner: Norwegian Cruise Line
- Port of registry: Nassau, Bahamas
- Builder: Fincantieri, Marghera
- Sponsored by: ELLE (Street Art)
- Christened: March 27, 2026
- In service: 2026–present
- Status: In service

General characteristics
- Class & type: Prima-class cruise ship
- Tonnage: 156,300 GT
- Length: 1,056 ft (322 m)
- Beam: 41 m
- Capacity: 3,565
- Crew: 1597

Norwegian Luna is a cruise ship operated by Norwegian Cruise Line of the Prima Plus class, the second and last ship of its subclass.

== History ==
In 2017, Norwegian Cruise Line ordered four ships of a novel class, scheduled for delivery from 2022 to 2025. Norwegian Luna's maiden itinerary was a 13-day cruise across the Atlantic from the Port of Civitavecchia to Miami completed between March 10 and March 23, 2026, marking the start of Luna's passenger service.

ELLE (Street Art) christened Norwegian Luna on March 27, 2026 at Miami.

=== Service history ===
For the 2026 season, Norwegian Luna is scheduled for 3–4 days visits to the Bahamas and seven day Caribbean itineraries.

== Design ==
Norwegian Luna is the sister ship and very similar to Norwegian Aqua both being about 10% larger than the older two ships of the Prima class (Norwegian Prima and Norwegian Viva). She is the second of the Prima Plus subclass. The external art of the ship was designed by ELLE Street Art.
