= Norwegian Cruise Line =

American cruise line

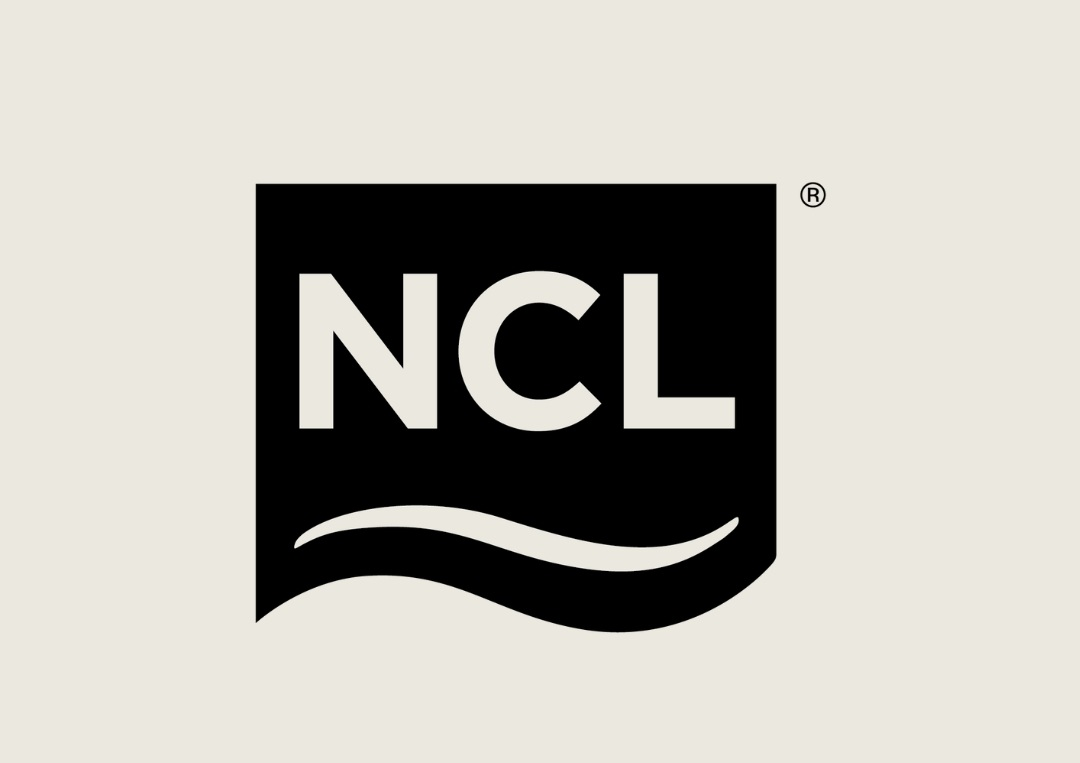
- Logo used since 2026

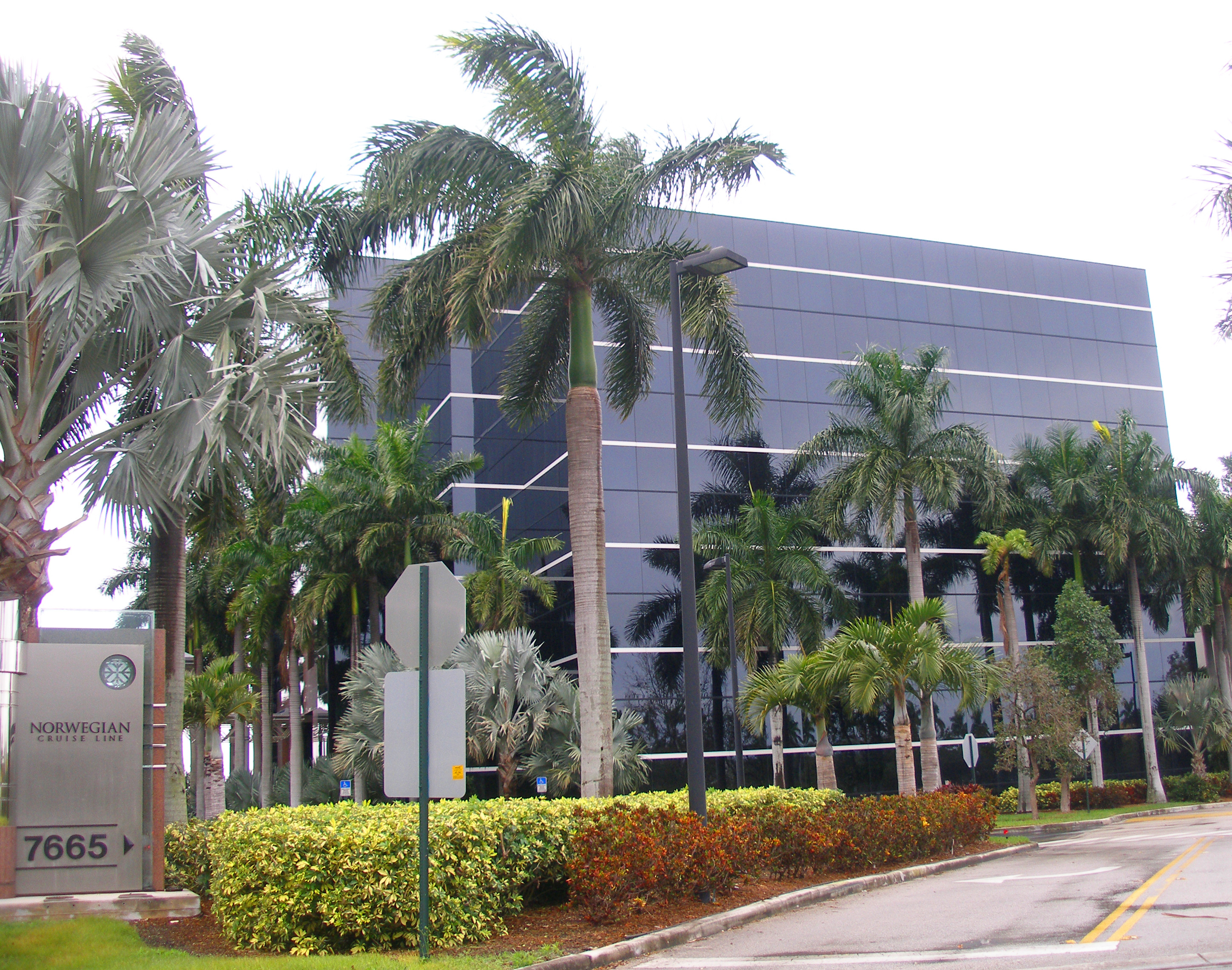
- Headquarters in Miami-Dade County, Florida
- Type: Subsidiary
- Industry: Tourism
- Founded: 1966; 60 years ago In Norway as Norwegian Caribbean Line
- Headquarters: Miami-Dade County, Florida, U.S.
- Area served: Worldwide
- Key people: John W. Chidsey (CEO); Marc Kazlauskas (President)
- Products: Cruises
- Revenue: $8.55 billion (2023)
- Parent: Norwegian Cruise Line Holdings
- Website: ncl.com

Norwegian Cruise Line (NCL) is an American cruise line founded in Norway in 1966. The company's headquarters are in Miami-Dade County, Florida, and incorporated in the Bahamas. It is the fourth-largest cruise line in the world by passengers, controlling about 8.6% of the total worldwide share of the cruise market by passengers as of 2021. It is wholly owned by parent company Norwegian Cruise Line Holdings.

== History ==
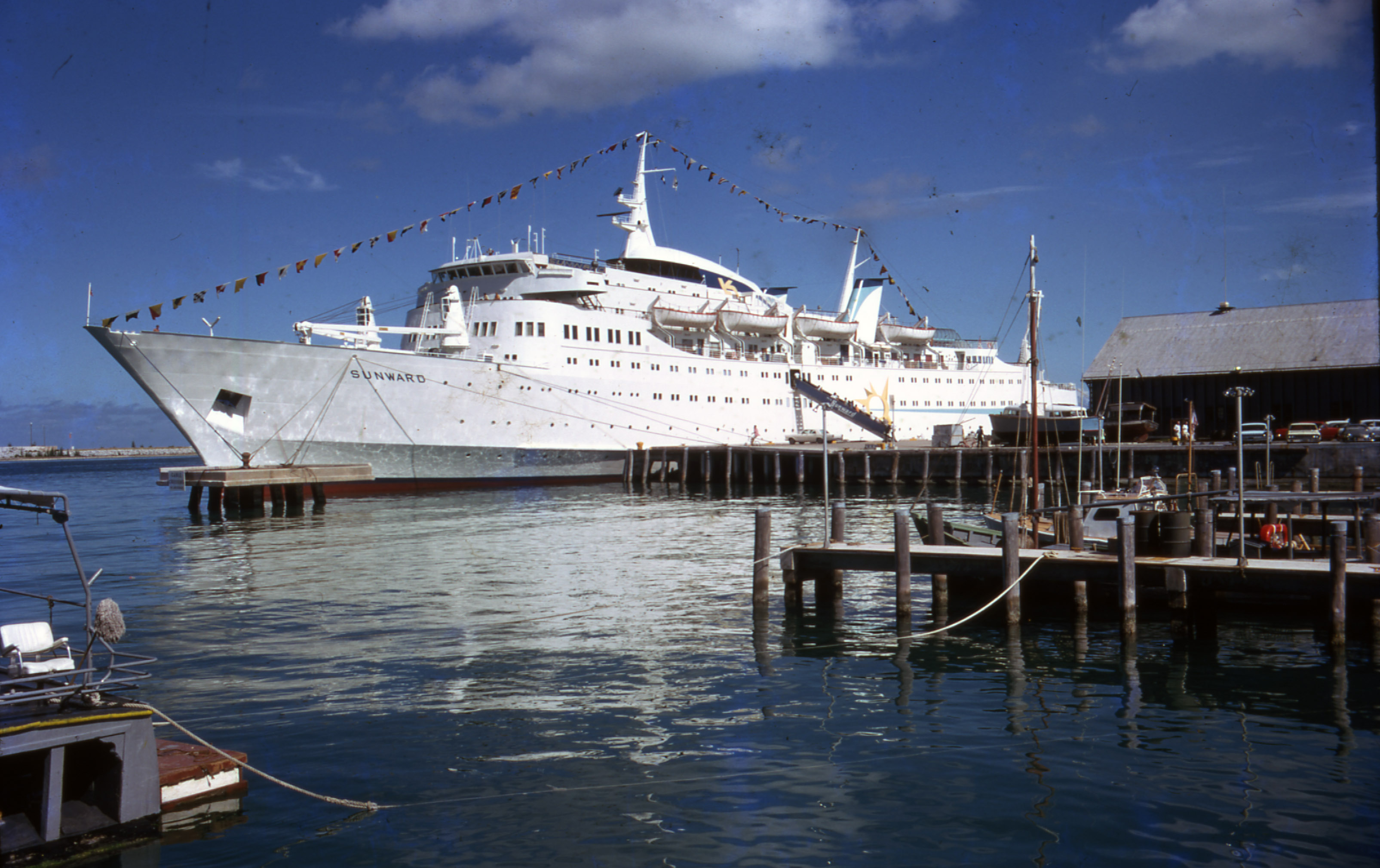
Norwegian Caribbean Line's first ship Sunward

The cruise line was founded in 1966 by Norwegian Knut Kloster and Israeli Ted Arison, with the 8,666-ton, 140 m (460 ft) long cruise ship/car ferry, Sunward, which in 1966 operated as a car ferry between Southampton and Gibraltar, for that one short season only. The Sunward was first managed under the Arison Shipping Company, and marketed as Ensign Cruises. Arison soon left to form Carnival Cruise Lines, while Kloster acquired additional ships for Caribbean service, with the line renamed and marketed as Norwegian Caribbean Lines.

=== Norwegian Caribbean Lines ===
Norwegian pioneered many firsts in the cruise industry, such as the first exclusive private island, Great Stirrup Cay in the Bahamas; the first combined air-sea program (marketed as "Cloud 9 Cruises"), which combined low-cost air fares with the cruise; Freestyle Cruising, which is a form of relaxed and informal cruising; and first shipline to develop new ports in the Caribbean, such as Ocho Rios in Jamaica.

==== First new builds ====
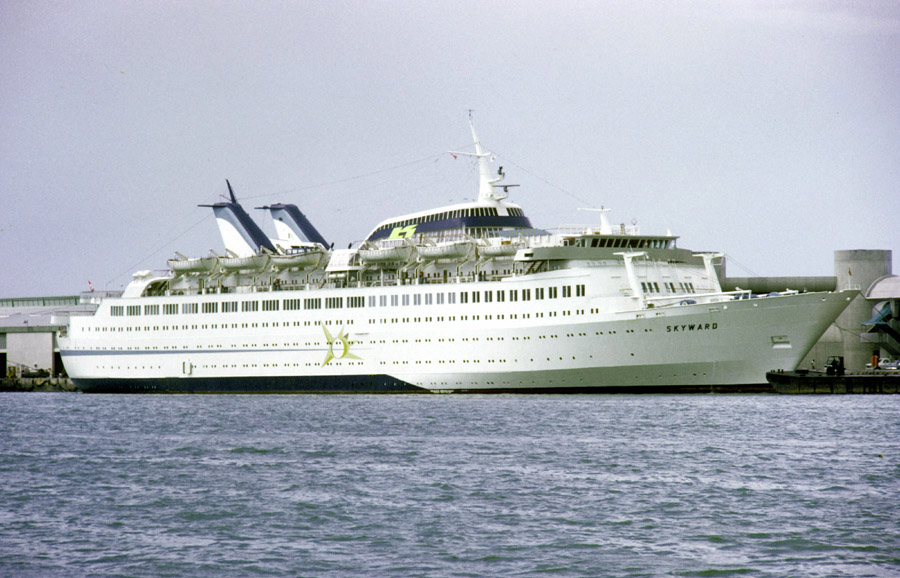
Starward and sister Skyward were the first purpose-built ships for NCL

Norwegian Cruise Line (NCL)'s second and third ship, Starward and Skyward, were the first newly built ships designed for the cruise line. Like the original Sunward of 1966, they had the capability to carry automobiles through a well-concealed stern door. Later, this area was turned into cabins and a two-deck movie theater, later to be used as a casino. NCL was responsible for many of the cruise innovations that have now become standard throughout the industry.

NCL would order two additional ships, that would be their first true cruise ships without any car carrying capacity. This would be the Southward in 1971, and an intended identical sister, Seaward, that would never be delivered to the line, and would be completed for P&O Cruises instead. The line would sell its original ship, Sunward, in 1973, being too small and inadequate for the modern cruise market. They would purchase the former Cunard Adventurer in 1977, refitting her with the trademark NCL funnels, and renamed Sunward II.

==== SS Norway ====
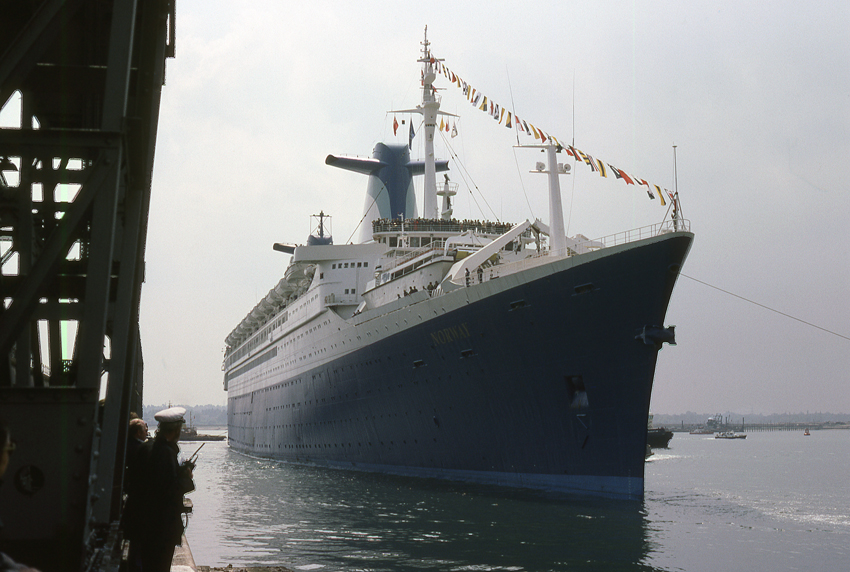
SS Norway arriving at Southampton

NCL made headlines with the acquisition of the liner SS France in 1979, rebuilding the liner as a cruise ship and renaming her Norway. The conversion cost more than US$100million. At 1,035 ft 8 in (315.67 m) long and displacing 52,000 tons, the Norway was at the time significantly larger than any existing cruise ship, and exploited the extra space available by adding a greater-than-usual variety of onboard entertainment. Her success paved the way for a new era of giant cruise ships.

==== Further newbuilds and acquisitions ====
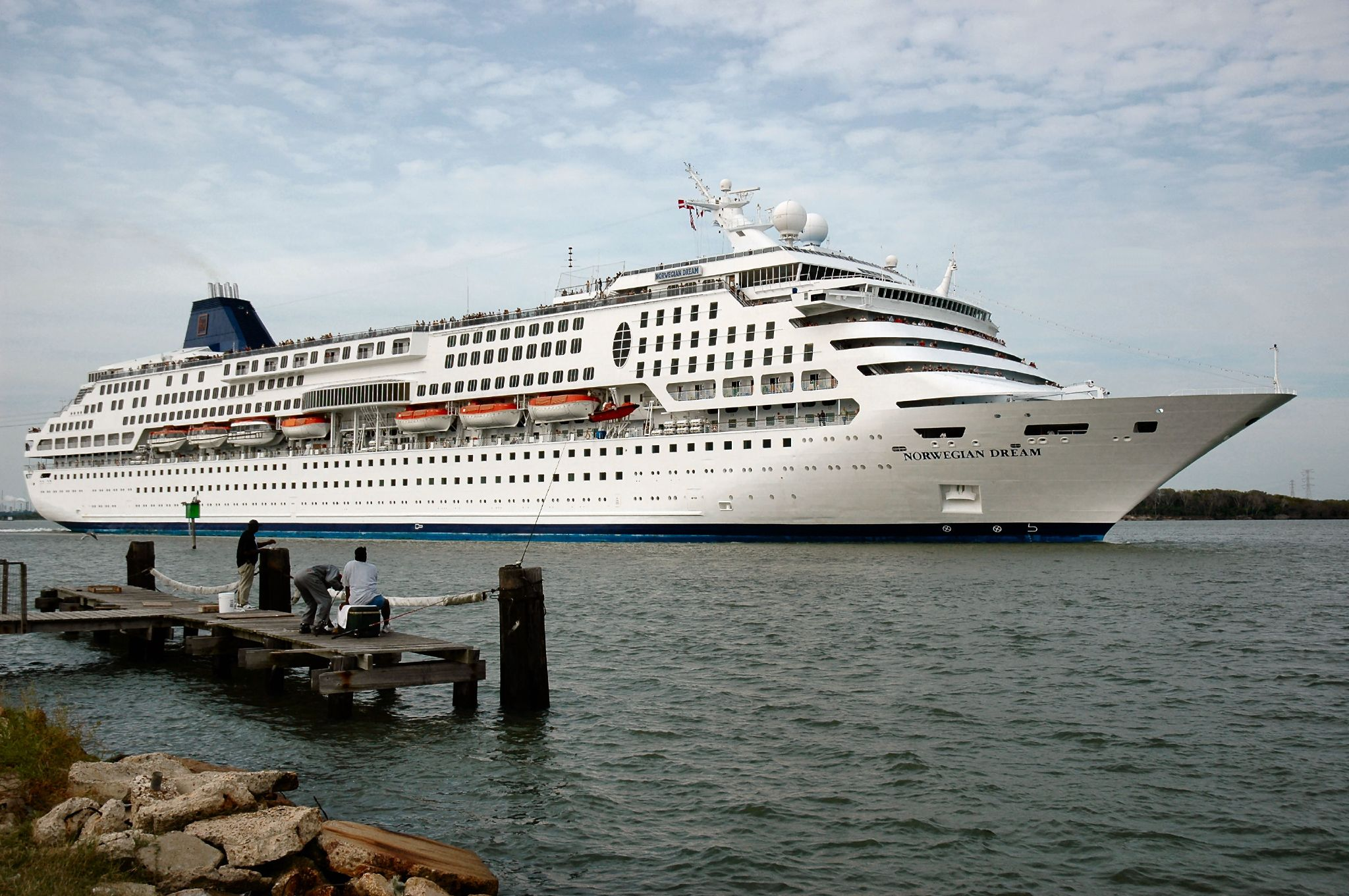
Norwegian Dream (former Dreamward)

With an aging, small ship fleet by the late 1980s compared to the larger modern ships being built for competitors Carnival and Royal Caribbean, Norwegian attempted to catch up with an order of a new ship in 1987, the new Seaward, NCL's first new build since 1971. Norwegian parent company Kloster would transfer two of the recently acquired Royal Viking Line ships to Norwegian, which became the Westward and Sunward (III). Kloster would acquire Royal Cruise Line in 1989–90, and would eventually transfer the Westward to their fleet. Norwegian would also continue with further orders of new ships in the early 1990s, not competing with large-sized cruise ship building trend of competitors, but with the smaller with the Dreamward and Windward to offer better flexibility with itineraries.

The line would continue to acquire second hand ships in the mid-1990s, with the addition of the Leeward in 1995. In 1996 the Crown Odyssey, which was part of NCL's subsidiary line Royal Cruise Line, was transferred and became the Norwegian Crown. In 1997 Norwegian acquired Majesty Cruise Line, and added their two ships, which became the Norwegian Majesty and Norwegian Dynasty. During this time Norwegian would rename all its ships with the "Norwegian" prefix (excluding SS Norway), and change its livery for the second time to a dark blue funnel with gold NCL logo.

Norwegian has expanded to other parts of the world, including Alaska, Europe, Bermuda, and Hawaii. Between 1997 and 2001, the company also operated cruises out of Australia under the name Norwegian Capricorn Line and acquired Orient Lines in 1998.

=== Acquisition by Star Cruises & Freestyle Cruising ===
Norwegian was sold by Kloster to Star Cruises in 2000, a subsidiary of Genting Hong Kong, part of the Malaysia-based Genting Group. Under the new ownership a new concept, freestyle cruising, was introduced with the newly completed ship, Norwegian Sky. This concept freed passengers from fixed formal dining times, instead there was relaxed attire, several distinct dining options, relaxed disembarkation and more lounges, bars, theatres and other entertainment and activity options, a change that would have a ripple effect across the cruise industry.

==== Fleet modernization ====
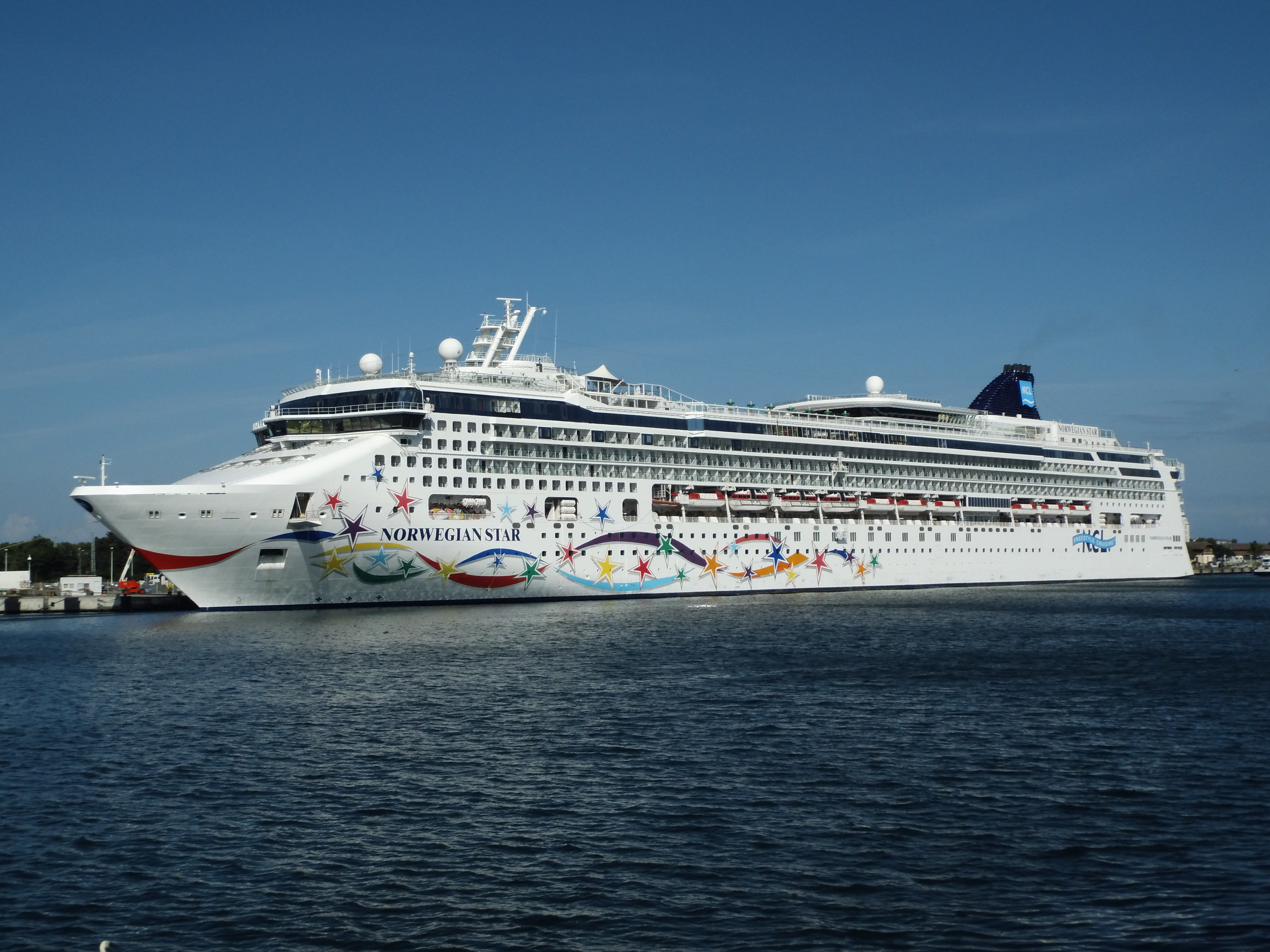
Norwegian Star – the first new build under Star Cruises ownership

With the financial backing of Star Cruises, the struggling Norwegian Cruise Line was able to begin to replace much of its older and second hand fleet with new ships. In addition to the Norwegian Sun, Star Cruises had ships already on order for their own fleet at Meyer Werft, which would be transferred to Norwegian during construction, with the first two debuting as the Norwegian Star in 2001 and Norwegian Dawn in 2002. These would be followed by an accelerated new build program, adding four more new ships over a five-year period.

==== NCL America ====
In 2002, Norwegian purchased the half-complete hull of the first Project America ship, at the time under construction at Ingalls Shipbuilding in Pascagoula, Mississippi, US, which was towed to Germany to be completed at the Lloyd Werft shipyard. Subsequently, Norwegian acquired the rights to move two ships built entirely outside the United States under the US flag, making it possible to start a US-flagged operation under the brand name NCL America. In 2003, the company announced the purchase of the American-flagged liners United States and Independence. In their July 2007 fiscal report, Norwegian noted the sale of Independence, renamed Oceanic some time before. On July 1, 2010, the SS United States Conservancy struck a deal to buy United States for $3 million. On February 1, 2011, the ownership was officially transferred to the SS United States Conservancy.

==== Departure of SS Norway ====
A boiler explosion in May 2003 forced Norwegian to withdraw the Norway from service, later being laid up in Bremerhaven, Germany, until 2005, when she was towed to Port Klang Malaysia with the claimed intent to use her as an anchored casino or slow overnight casino cruises on her remaining boilers. Instead, she was sold for scrap and renamed the Blue Lady and later beached at Alang, India, in August 2006 with claims that she had not been cleaned of toxic materials. On September 11, 2007, the India Supreme Court issued an order permitting her to be broken up at Alang, despite the presence of large amounts of hazardous asbestos remaining on board.

==== Apollo Management and reorganisation ====
In August 2007, Star Cruises sold 50% of Norwegian for $1 billion to US-based Apollo Management to strengthen Norwegian's financial position. In 2007, Star Cruises sold Orient Line's Marco Polo to Transocean Tours, and Orient Lines ceased operations in early 2008.

Following an initial public offering and corporate reorganisation in 2013, Norwegian was made a wholly owned subsidiary of Norwegian Cruise Line Holdings (NCLH), while Norwegian's previous owners Genting Hong Kong, Apollo Management and TPG Capital exchanged their stakes in Norwegian for shares in the newly listed NCLH.

=== Further new builds and fleet changes ===
Norwegian reported in February 2008 that the Pride of Aloha, one of the two remaining NCL America ships, would be withdrawn from service in May of the same year. Initial reports suggested she would be transferred to the fleet of Star Cruises, but it was later announced that she would return to the Norwegian international fleet as the Norwegian Sky, while the Norwegian Majesty and Norwegian Dream would be sold to Louis Cruise Lines.

==== Norwegian Epic ====
Two ships in the Epic class were ordered by NCL in November 2006, with an option for a third vessel that was not exercised. A dispute between NCL and STX initially resulted in the construction of both ships being placed on hold until a new agreement was reached. The agreement called for completion of the first ship; the second ship was cancelled in 2008. The sole remaining ship, Norwegian Epic, was delivered to NCL on 17 June 2010.

==== Breakaway class ====
The first two Breakaway-class ships entered service in 2013 and 2014 as Norwegian Breakaway and Norwegian Getaway. On October 17, 2012, Meyer Werft and Norwegian reached a second agreement for the construction of two new vessels, slated for delivery in October 2015 and 2017, respectively. The project was under the code name "Breakaway Plus Class", with the vessels expected to be 163,000 gross tons and hold 4,200 passengers. The Norwegian Escape entered service in November 2015 and Norwegian Joy in 2017. Two more vessels were ordered on July 14, 2014, and they entered service in 2018 and 2019 as the Norwegian Bliss and Norwegian Encore, respectively. Dream Cruises ordered two modified Breakaway Class ships in 2015, they were launched in 2016 and 2017 as Genting Dream and World Dream.

The sale of the Norwegian Dream was subsequently cancelled. The Norwegian Dream became Superstar Gemini for Star Cruises, from January 2013.

On June 1, 2012, Norwegian announced the signing of a memorandum of agreement to exercise its option to purchase Norwegian Sky. The purchase price was roughly $260 million, financing being provided by the seller.

In December 2016, Norwegian Cruise Line announced it had reached an agreement with the Cuban government. In May 2017, the Norwegian Sky was the first Norwegian Cruise Line vessel to ever visit Cuba. The Norwegian Sky made weekly trips from Miami to Havana, making Norwegian the only line sailing that route weekly. Norwegian continued operating Cuban routes until June 2019, when they came to a halt following new restrictions from the Trump Administration.

===== Project Leonardo =====
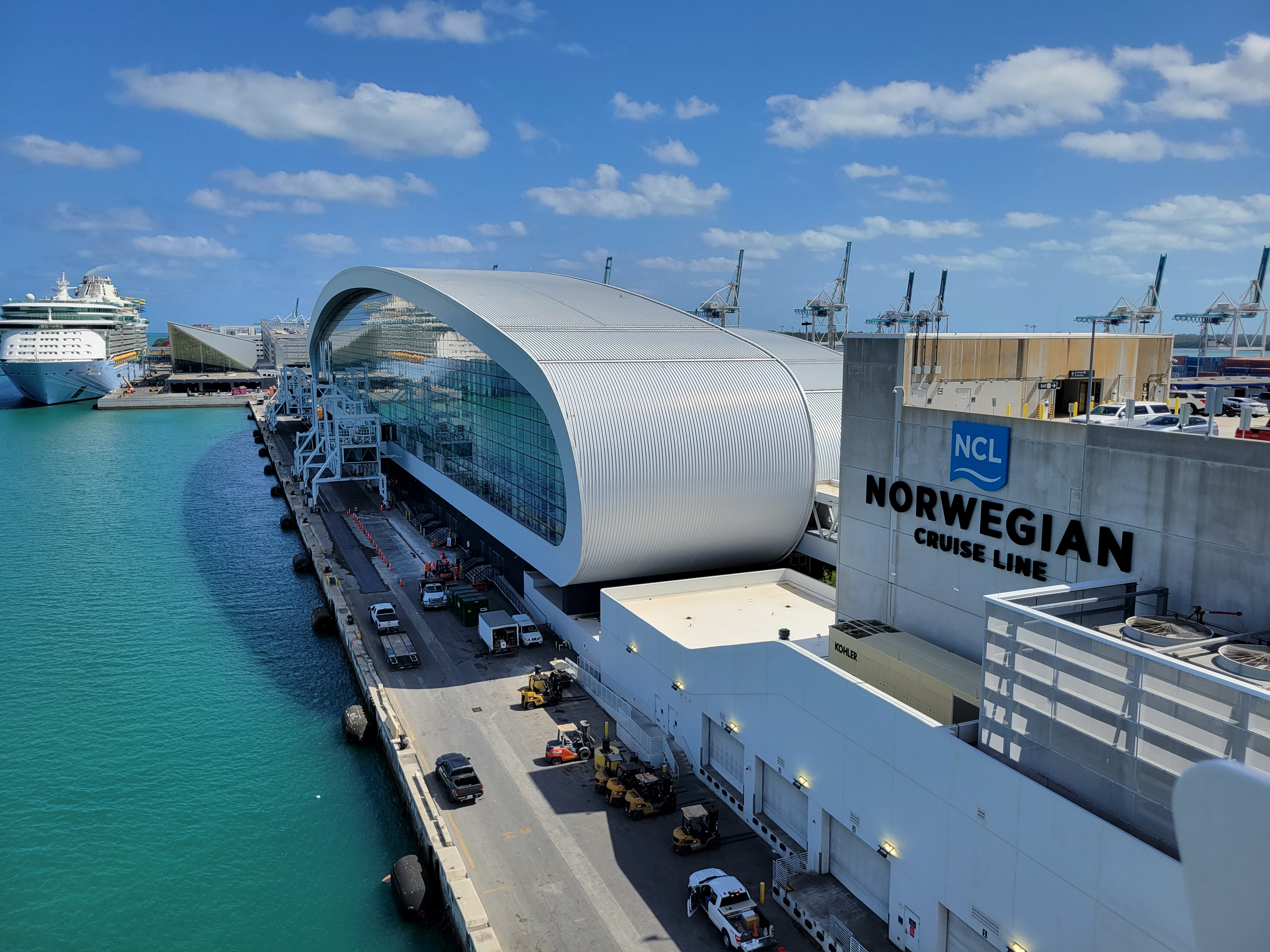
Norwegian Cruise Line Terminal B at PortMiami (March 2024).

In February 2017, Norwegian ordered 4 new ships from Fincantieri under the codename "Project Leonardo", to be delivered in 2022–2025. These ships would have around 140,000 gross tonnage. In July 2018, NCL confirmed that they had ordered 2 more ships to be delivered in 2026–27. On December 9, 2019, the keel of the first ship was laid down and named Norwegian Prima. It was launched in August 2021 and commenced sailing in the same month of 2022. The second ship was named Norwegian Viva in early 2022 and expected to be completed by 2023.

On May 2, 2017, Norwegian Cruise Line announced a new PortMiami Terminal. The construction began on May 1, 2018, and was completed in fall 2019. In December 2018, Norwegian revealed plans to build a new pier in Alaska's Icy Strait Point.

=== COVID-19 pandemic ===
In March 2020, the Miami New Times reported that managers at Norwegian had prepared a set of responses intended to convince customers wary of the ongoing COVID-19 pandemic to book cruises, including "blatantly false" claims that the coronavirus "can only survive in cold temperatures, so the Caribbean is a fantastic choice for your next cruise", that "scientists and medical professionals have confirmed that the warm weather of the spring will be the end of the coronavirus", and that the virus "cannot live in the amazingly warm and tropical temperatures that your cruise will be sailing to."

On March 14, 2020, the U.S. Centers for Disease Control and Prevention (CDC) issued a No Sail Order for cruise ships. Concurrently Norwegian Cruise Line Holdings implemented a suspension of all cruise voyages across its three brands (Norwegian Cruise Line, Oceania Cruises, and Regent Seven Seas Cruises), with all 28 ships in port or at anchor and all passengers disembarked by March 28, 2020. This suspension has subsequently been extended through June 30, 2020.

On May 5, 2020, in a filing with the Securities and Exchange Commission, Norwegian Cruise Line Holdings (NCLH) said there is “substantial doubt” about its ability to continue as a “going concern” as it faces a liquidity crisis over the next twelve months.

By the next day, NCLH was able to secure over $2.2 billion of additional liquidity in oversubscribed capital markets transactions, but at a price: (1) $400 million in common stock at $11 per share; (2) $675 million in senior secured notes due 2024 at a 12.25% interest rate; (3) $750 million in exchangeable notes due 2024 at 6% interest rate, and exchangeable at any time into common shares at $13.75; and (4) $400 million private investment from a global private equity firm. On May 7, 2020, NCLH CEO declared that the company has secured enough liquidity to get through potentially 18 months of zero revenues and may resume cruising later in 2020.

In anticipation of sailing again, Norwegian is implementing new health and safety measures, including installing H13 HEPA air filters. The company is also working with the CDC and the new color-coding system to indicate each ship's COVID-19 status, and to repatriate Norwegian crews still stuck aboard their vessel.

Even though the company lost $4 billion and furloughed 20 percent of its staff, it doubled the salary of its chief executive, Frank Del Rio, to $36.4 million.

=== Post COVID-19 pandemic ===
==== Leadership changes ====
Frank Del Rio retired June 30th, 2023 but was to stay on through 2025 as a senior advisor. Harry Sommer became CEO after Frank Del Rio retired. Sommers stepped down from his position at Norwegian in 2026 and was replaced by John W. Chidsey. Former CEO Frank Del Rio filed a lawsuit against Norwegian for millions saying he was forced to retire early on a promise to be paid for consulting to 2027. His lawsuit says he was given an agreement that did not fully list his full compensation to cover-up the full compensation expenses of executives.

==== Customer satisfaction ====
A 2026 Consumer Reports survey, based on feedback from almost 19,000 cruise passengers over the previous three years, rated Norwegian Cruise Line in last place for customer satisfaction among 19 cruise lines. The low rating was driven by low quality food, variety of food, customer service, value, and onboard activities and entertainment.

== Private islands ==
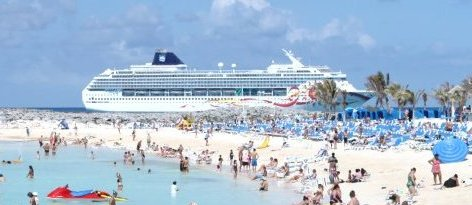
Great Stirrup Cay

Norwegian owns two private islands in the Caribbean: Harvest Caye in Belize and Great Stirrup Cay in the Bahamas.

== Subsidiary Cruise Lines ==
Norwegian Cruise Line subsidiary lines over the years:

- Royal Viking Line (1984–1994)
- Royal Cruise Line (1989–1996)
- Norwegian Capricorn Line (1997–2001)
- Orient Lines (1998–2008)
- NCL America (2004–2008)
- Oceania Cruises (2014–present)
- Regent Seven Seas Cruises (2014–present)

== Fleet ==
As of March 2026, Norwegian Cruise Line operates 21 cruise ships, with seven on order. It has also previously owned or operated 19 other ships. All its ships are flagged to the Bahamas, except for Pride of America, which operates cruises within the United States and is flagged and registered in the US, as well as being owned by a US-registered subsidiary, NCL America.

=== Current fleet ===
Ship	Built	In service for NCL	Last refurbishment	Gross tonnage	Length	Passengers (Double Occupancy)	Crew	Flag	Notes	Image
Leo class
Norwegian Spirit	1998	2004–present	2022	75,904	880 ft	1,972	904	Bahamas	Previously SuperStar Leo	
Sun class
Norwegian Sun	2001	2001–present	2024	78,309	848 ft	1,878	906	Bahamas	Scheduled to exit fleet in 2027	
Dawn class
Norwegian Star	2001	2001–present	2021	91,740	965 ft	2,298	1,031	Bahamas	Originally ordered as Superstar Libra	
Norwegian Dawn	2002	2002–present	2024	92,250	965 ft	2,290	1,032	Bahamas	Originally ordered as SuperStar Scorpio	
Pride of America class
Pride of America	2005	2005–present	2025	80,439	920 ft	2,180	927	United States	The only US flagged cruise ship	
Jewel class
Norwegian Jewel	2005	2005–present	2025	93,502	965 ft	2,368	1,069	Bahamas		
Norwegian Jade	2006	2006–present	2022	93,558	965 ft	2,352	1,037	Bahamas	Formerly Pride Of Hawaii, renamed in 2008.	
Norwegian Pearl	2006	2006–present	2021	93,530	965 ft	2,344	1,072	Bahamas		
Norwegian Gem	2007	2007–present	2022	93,530	965 ft	2,344	1,070	Bahamas		
Epic class
Norwegian Epic	2010	2010–present	2025	155,873	1,081 ft	4,070	1,724	Bahamas	The only ship in her class	
Breakaway class
Norwegian Breakaway	2013	2013–present	2025	145,655	1,068 ft	3,903	1,657	Bahamas		
Norwegian Getaway	2014	2014–present	2024	145,655	1,068 ft	3,903	1,646	Bahamas		
Norwegian Escape	2015	2015–present	2022	164,998	1,069 ft	4,218	1,733	Bahamas	'Breakaway Plus' subclass	
Norwegian Joy	2017	2017–present	2024	167,725	1,094 ft	3,776	1,821	Bahamas	'Breakaway Plus' subclass	
Norwegian Bliss	2018	2018–present	2025	168,028	1,094 ft	4,010	1,716	Bahamas	'Breakaway Plus' subclass	
Norwegian Encore	2019	2019–present	2024	169,116	1,094 ft	3,958	1,735	Bahamas	'Breakaway Plus' subclass. Largest ship in NCL's fleet.	
Prima class
Norwegian Prima	2022	2022–present	None	143,535	965 ft	3,195	1,506	Bahamas		
Norwegian Viva	2023	2023–present	None	142,500	965 ft	3,195	1,506	Bahamas		
Norwegian Aqua	2025	2025–present	None	156,000	1,056 ft	3,571	1,597	Bahamas	'Prima Plus' subclass.	
Norwegian Luna	2026	2026–present	None	156,300	1,056 ft	3,565	1,597	Bahamas	'Prima Plus' subclass.	

=== Future fleet ===
Ship	Inaugural Voyage	Gross tonnage	Passengers	Notes
Prima-class
Norwegian Aura	2027	172,000	3,840	Floated out Apr 16 2026 “Methanol-Ready” 1,130 ft long 1,757 crew
Norwegian Bella	2028	172,000	3,880	“Methanol-Ready”
Unnamed class (Maxi-order to Fincantieri)
Unnamed	2030	227,000	5,000	New class of ship comprising the largest vessels ever commissioned for NCL
Unnamed	2032	227,000	5,000	New class of ship comprising the largest vessels ever commissioned for NCL
Unnamed	2034	227,000	5,000	New class of ship comprising the largest vessels ever commissioned for NCL
Unnamed	2036	227,000	5,000	New class of ship comprising the largest vessels ever commissioned for NCL
Unnamed	2037	227,000	5,000	New class of ship comprising the largest vessels ever commissioned for NCL

=== Former fleet ===
Ship	Built	In service for NCL	Gross tonnage	Status as of 2026	Image
Sunward	1966	1966–1973	10,558	Scrapped in 2004 at Chittagong, Bangladesh.	
Starward	1968	1968–1995	15,781	Scrapped in 2018 at Alang, India.	
Skyward	1969	1969–1991	15,653	Scrapped in 2021 at Alang, India.	
Southward	1971	1971–1994	16,710	Scrapped in 2013 at Aliaga, Turkey.	
Sunward II	1971	1977–1991	14,194	Scrapped in 2014 at Alang, India.	
Norway	1961	1979–2003	76,049	Scrapped in 2008 at Alang, India.	
Seaward / Norwegian Sea	1988	1988–2005	42,285	Scrapped in 2022 in Aliağa, Turkey.	
Westward	1972	1991–1993	28,613	Scrapped in 2022 at Alang, India.	
Sunward	1973	1991–1992, 1992–1993	28,551	Scrapped in 2021 at Aliaga, Turkey.	
Dreamward / Norwegian Dream	1992	1992–2008	50,764	Since 2012 SuperStar Gemini for Star Cruises. Scrapped in 2022 at Alang, India.	
Windward / Norwegian Wind	1993	1993–2007	51,309	Since 2007 SuperStar Aquarius for Star Cruises. Scrapped in 2022 at Alang, India.	
Leeward	1980	1995–1999	25,611	Since 2014 Celestyal Crystal for Celestyal Cruise Lines. Scrapped in 2025 at Alang, India.	
Norwegian Crown	1988	1996–2000, 2003–2007	43,537	Since 2008 Balmoral for Fred Olsen Cruise Lines.	
Norwegian Star	1973	1997–1998	28,518	Scrapped in 2021 in Alang, India	
Norwegian Dynasty	1993	1997–1999	24,344	Since 2024, Villa Vie Odyssey for Villa Vie Residences. 2001-2024 - Braemar for Fred Olsen Cruise Lines.	
Norwegian Majesty	1992	1997–2009	41,662	Since 2018 Crown Iris for Mano Maritime.	
Norwegian Sky	1999	1999–2004, 2008–2026	77,104	Constructed as Costa Olympia but sold to NCL during construction. Sailed under NCL America as Pride of Aloha from 2004 to 2008. Since 2026 Cordelia Sky for Cordelia Cruises.	

=== Ships which never entered service for NCL ===
Ship	Built	Years in NCL	Gross tonnage	El Original NCL Plan for the Ships and reason for cancellation	Status as of 2026	Image
Independence	1951	2003–2005	26,658	NCL's plan was to turn it into a cruise ship for NCL America.	Wrecked and scrapped in 2010 off Alang, India.	
United States	1952	2003–2009	38,216	NCL's plan was to turn it into a cruise ship for NCL America.	Scuttled as the world's largest artificial reef near Florida.	
Seaward	1972	1972	17,042	The vessel was originally ordered in 1970 by Norwegian Caribbean Line (Now Norwegian Cruise Line) as Seaward. The shipyard encountered financial troubles and was consequently taken over by the IRI Group, which cancelled the building contract. After protest from NCL the IRI Group agreed to partially complete the vessel. NCL sold the hull to P&O, which would complete the Seaward as Spirit of London.	Sank in 2016 near the port of Laem Chabang, Thailand.	
