= National Airlines =

A national airline is a country's flag carrier.

The National Airlines name has been used by several United States airlines:

- National Airlines (1934–1980), a passenger airline based in Miami, Florida
- National Airlines (1983–1985), a cargo and charter airline, based in New York, New York
- Private Jet Expeditions marketed scheduled services as National Airlines in 1994
- National Airlines (1999–2002), low-cost airline based in Las Vegas, Nevada
- National Airlines (N8), a cargo and charter airline based in Orlando, Florida

== See also ==
- Air National, an airline based in Auckland, New Zealand
- Nationair
- National Airways Corporation, an airline based in Johannesburg, South Africa
- New Zealand National Airways Corporation, New Zealand's state-owned domestic carrier 1945–1978
