= MS Sunward (1966) =

Cruise ship

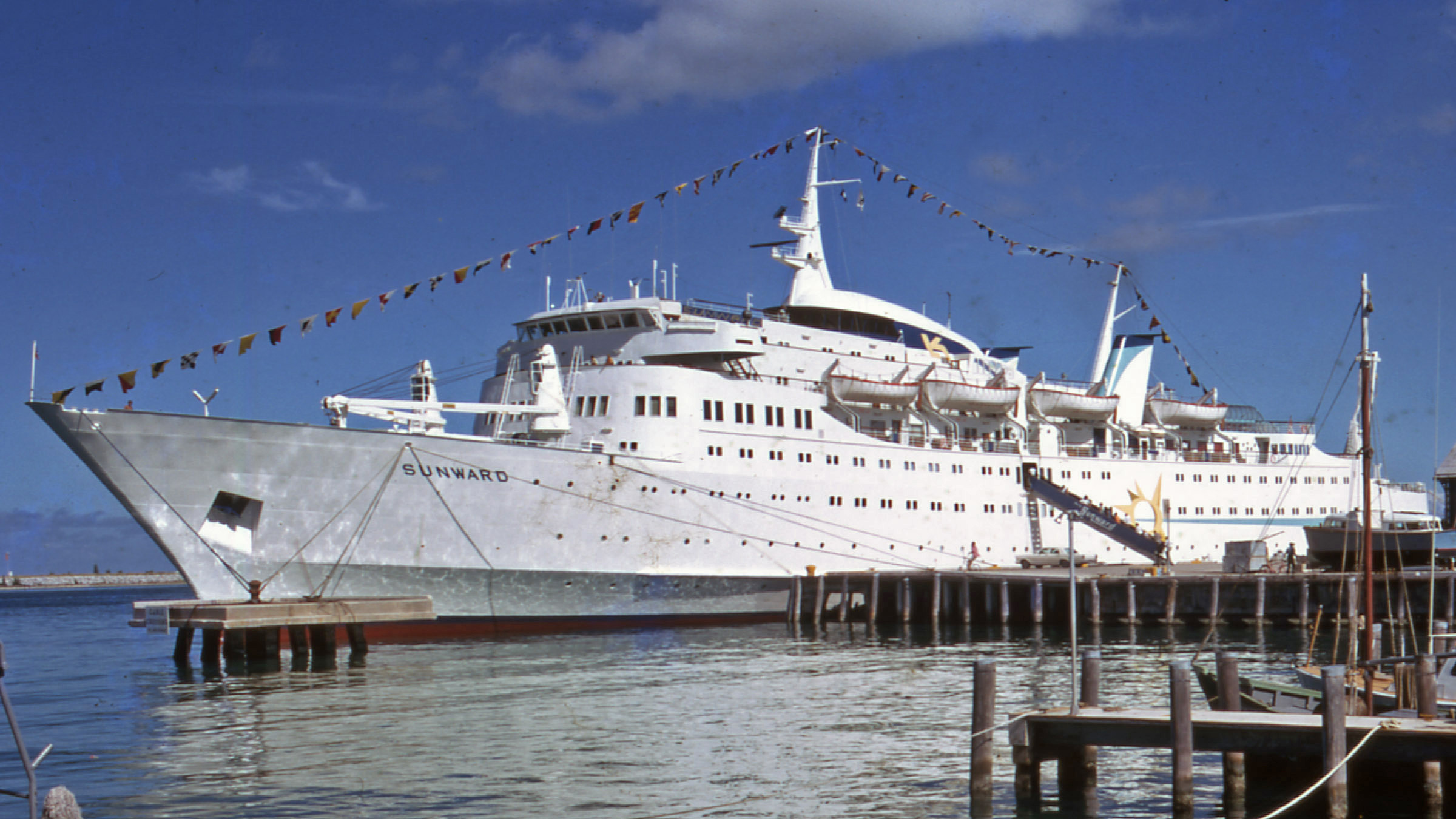
- MS Sunward in Key West in 1970

History
- Name: 1966-1972: Sunward; 1973-1977: Ile de Beauté; 1977: Grand Flotel; 1978-1988: Saudi Moon I; 1988-1990: Ocean Spirit; 1990-1993: Scandinavian Song; 1993-1994: Santiago de Cuba; 1994-2003: The Empress; 2003-2004: Empress
- Operator: 1966: Kloster Sunward Ferries; 1966-1972: Norwegian Caribbean Line; 1973-1976: CTGM; 1976-1977: SNCM; 1977: Eastern Gulf, Inc.; 1978-1984: Amar Line; 1984-1988: Sabah Maritime Services Co.; 1988-1993: Ocean Quest International; 1991-1993: SeaEscape; 1993-1994: Fratelli Cosulich; 1994-2003: Empress Cruise Ltd.; 2003-2004: Jaisu Shipping Company
- Port of registry: 1966-1973: Norway; 1973-1977: France; 1977: United Arab Emirates; 1988-1990: United States; 1990-1993: (The Bahamas) Bahamas; 1993-2004: Panama City
- Ordered: 1966
- Builder: Bergens Mekaniske Verksted
- Yard number: 455
- Laid down: July 1965
- Launched: 24 March 1966
- Completed: 1966
- Acquired: 20 June 1966
- Maiden voyage: 25 June 1966
- In service: 1966
- Out of service: 2004
- Identification: IMO number: 6610663
- Fate: Scrapped in Chittagong, Bangladesh, 2004

General characteristics
- Tonnage: 8,666 tons
- Length: 443 feet
- Decks: 7
- Installed power: 1,800kW
- Propulsion: Two B&W 12-42VT2BF - 90 Diesel
- Speed: 20 knots
- Capacity: 558
- Crew: 220

MS Sunward was a cruise ship built in 1966 for Knut Kloster. Originally designed and built for ferrying passengers and vehicles around the Bay of Biscay and Gibraltar, the promise and success of the Sunward would be short-lived. English currency restriction and the border closing between Spain and Gibraltar defeated the newly built ship's initial purpose. Ted Arison, an Israeli businessman, contacted Kloster about the possibility of converting the Sunward into a cruise ship in Miami. The Sunward operated as a cruise ship under the newly established Norwegian Caribbean Line. The ship proved to be such a success that Norwegian Caribbean Line commissioned newer, larger ships for its fleet, ultimately replacing the Sunward. She was sold to Compagnie Générale Transméditerranéenne in 1973, and later on with several companies. In 2004, the former Sunward was sold to Bangladeshi breakers for scrap. The vessel appeared in the 1970 dramatic film, "Darker than Amber" and the 1989 comedy "Going Overboard".

== History ==
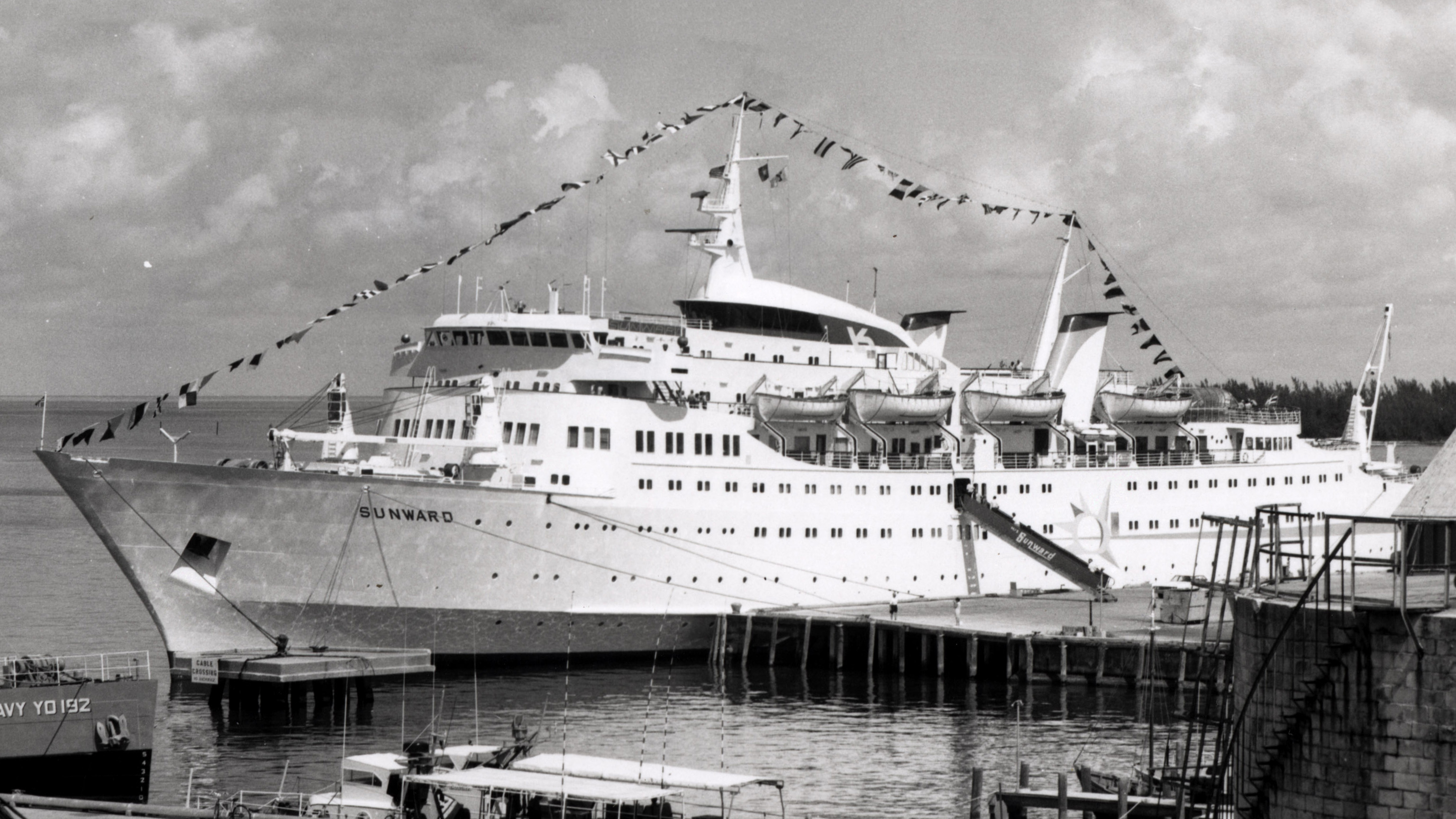
Sunward in Key West, 1970

In June 1966, Norwegian businessman and owner of Klosters Rederi A/S, Knut Kloster, commissioned a car ferry for cruise-ferry service between Southamptom, Vigo, Lisbon, and Gibraltar under the operation of its new subsidiary Kloster Sunward Ferries. Designed by Copenhagen-based naval architect Tage Wandborg of Knud E. Hansen A/S, the Sunward was constructed as a large, purpose-built passenger-and-car liner that provided a safe and comfortable ride for passengers en route to the Mediterranean via the often-stormy waters of the Bay of Biscay. While she had great success in the first few months in service, it would be short-lived. The United Kingdom enacted a law that restricted the currency which UK citizens could take out of the country, and Spain’s General Franco closed the frontier between Spain and Gibraltar, meaning that UK tourists could not get past the border into Spain. Later during the autumn season, representatives from Silja Line working for Celebrity Cruises were interested in a possible purchase of the Sunward, but it turned down since it was not an ice class vessel. The owners instead continue searching and successfully connected with Royal Caribbean by rebranding Norwegian Cruise Line Holdings into Norwegian Caribbean Lines.

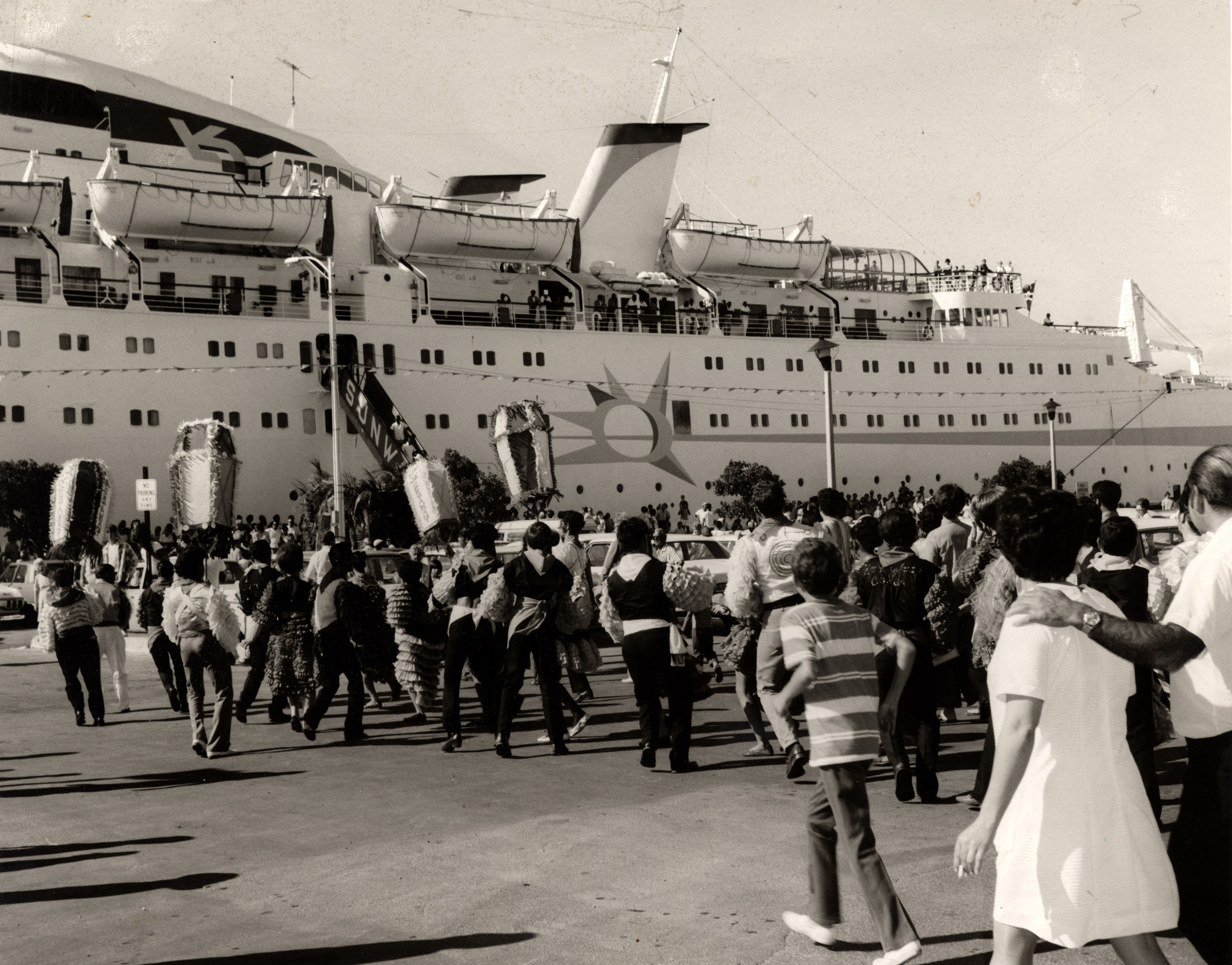
The Sunward in September 1970

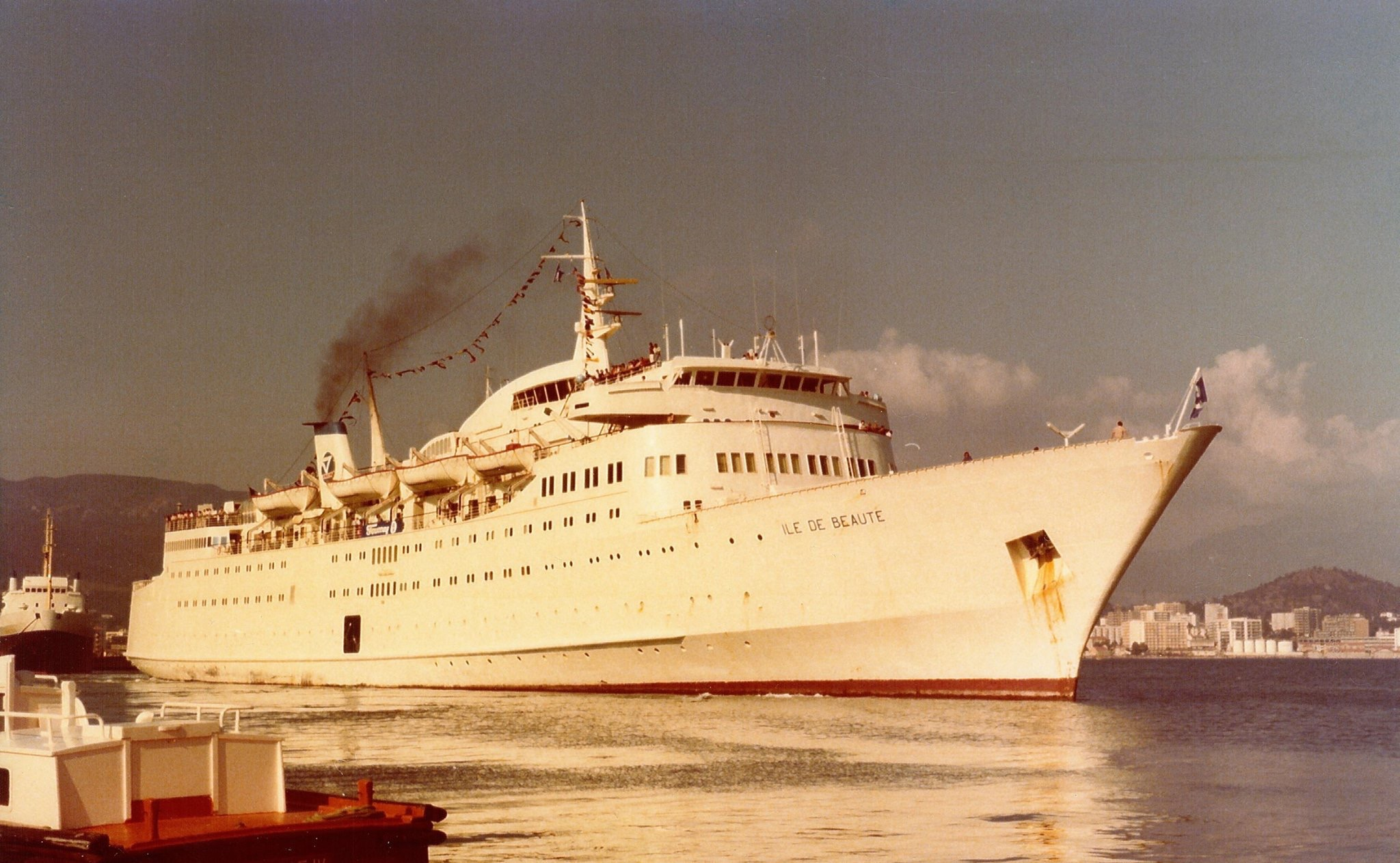
Ile de Beauté

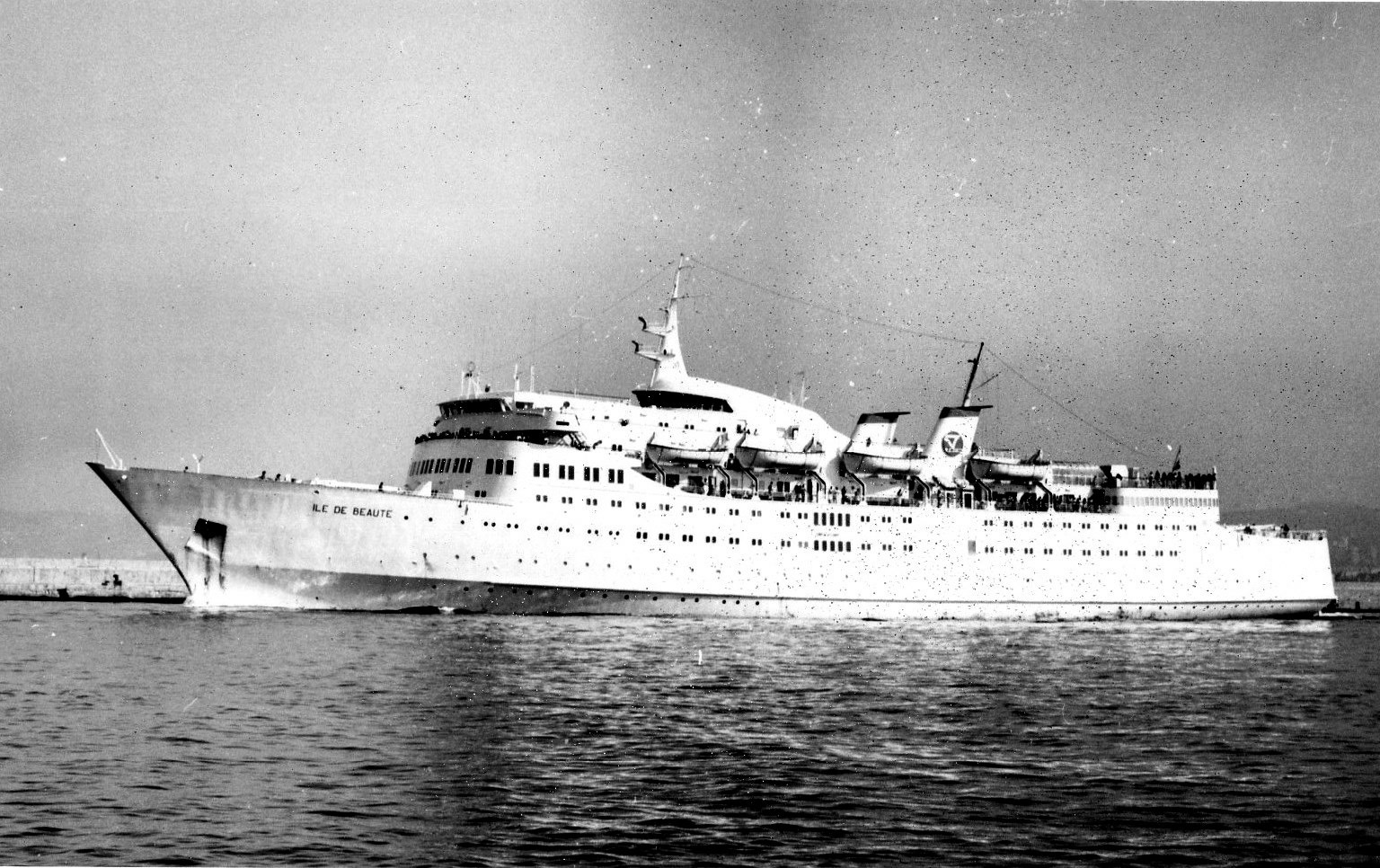
Ile de Beauté in Marseille,1976

Meanwhile, Ted Arison, owner of the shipping firm T. Arison Company Inc., was in troubled waters after the Nili, a cruise ship, was seized in November 1966 by the Israeli government after its owner, Nili-Somerfin Car Ferries, Ltd., failed to meet mortgage payments. After five days of legal fighting, a frustrated Arison canceled the operations planned for the Nili and Bilu, which left Arison with large numbers of advance bookings without a ship. Arison would later learn the fate of Kloster’s Sunward, and emerged with the possibility of transforming her into a cruise ship in Miami. Arison contacted Kloster about the decision of having the ship go on three- and four-day cruises to the Bahamas. Both men joined forces the same year to establish a Florida-based cruise operation called Norwegian Caribbean Line. On December 19, 1966, the Sunward sailed from Miami with 540 passengers on the first three- and four- day cruises to be offered year-round by Norwegian Caribbean Line between Miami and the Bahamas. An immediate success, Norwegian Caribbean Line led the way with its introduction of a fleet of sleek, new “white ships”: MS Starward (1968), MS Skyward (1969), MS Southward (1971), and MS Sunward II (1971), replacing the original Sunward. The pioneering Sunward was sold to the French state-owned Compagnie Generale Transmediterranee (CGTM) in 1972, entering service as the Ile de Beaute the following year. Ile de Beaute was transferred to Société Nationale Maritime Corse Méditerranée (SNCM), but was eventually sold to Eastern Gulf, Inc. due to its small size for the fleet. Eastern Gulf, Inc. renamed the Ile de Beaute as the Grand Flotel converted for hotel use in Sharjah, United Arab Emirates in 1977.

In 1979, she was sold to Amar Line, a joint venture between the Monaco-based Vlasov Group and the Saudi entrepreneur Gaith Pharaon. She was renamed Saudi Moon I and entered service between Jeddah and Suez. In 1988, Saudi Moon I was sold to Ocean Quest International of New Orleans, and renamed Ocean Spirit, which she undertook cruises on routes to New Orleans-Cozumel-Belize-Cancun and St. Petersburg-Belize Reef-Cozumel-Roaten-Guanaja. Ocean Quest International eventually chartered the Ocean Spirit to International Shipping Partners in 1990, and was renamed as the Scandinavian Song and placed into service to its subsidiary SeaEscape. SeaEscape returned the Scandinavian Song the following year to its owner so it can be used by Danish Cruise Lines for cruises from San Juan, Puerto Rico, in November. In 1993, Danish Cruise Lines returned the Scandinavian Song back to SeaEscape, which began cruises-to-nowhere and weekly trips on April 16 to Freeport, Bahamas.

In December 1993, the Italian company Fratelli Cosulich, and Havanatours went into a joint venture to sail the 300-passenger ship––now known as the Santiago de Cuba–- to different Cuban ports, as well as trips to Cozumel and Montego Bay, Jamaica. Cruising of the Santiago de Cuba was not successful as its cabins never filled to full capacity and was operating at a continual loss, thus the joint venture folded within a couple months of operating the ship. Soon she was chartered to Empress Cruises Ltd., which used her for short cruises from Port Klang until 2003, when she was sold to Indian company Jaisu Shipping. In 2004, the aging vessel was finally sold off to the breakers for scrap in Chittagong, Bangladesh.
