= Starward =

Cruise ship

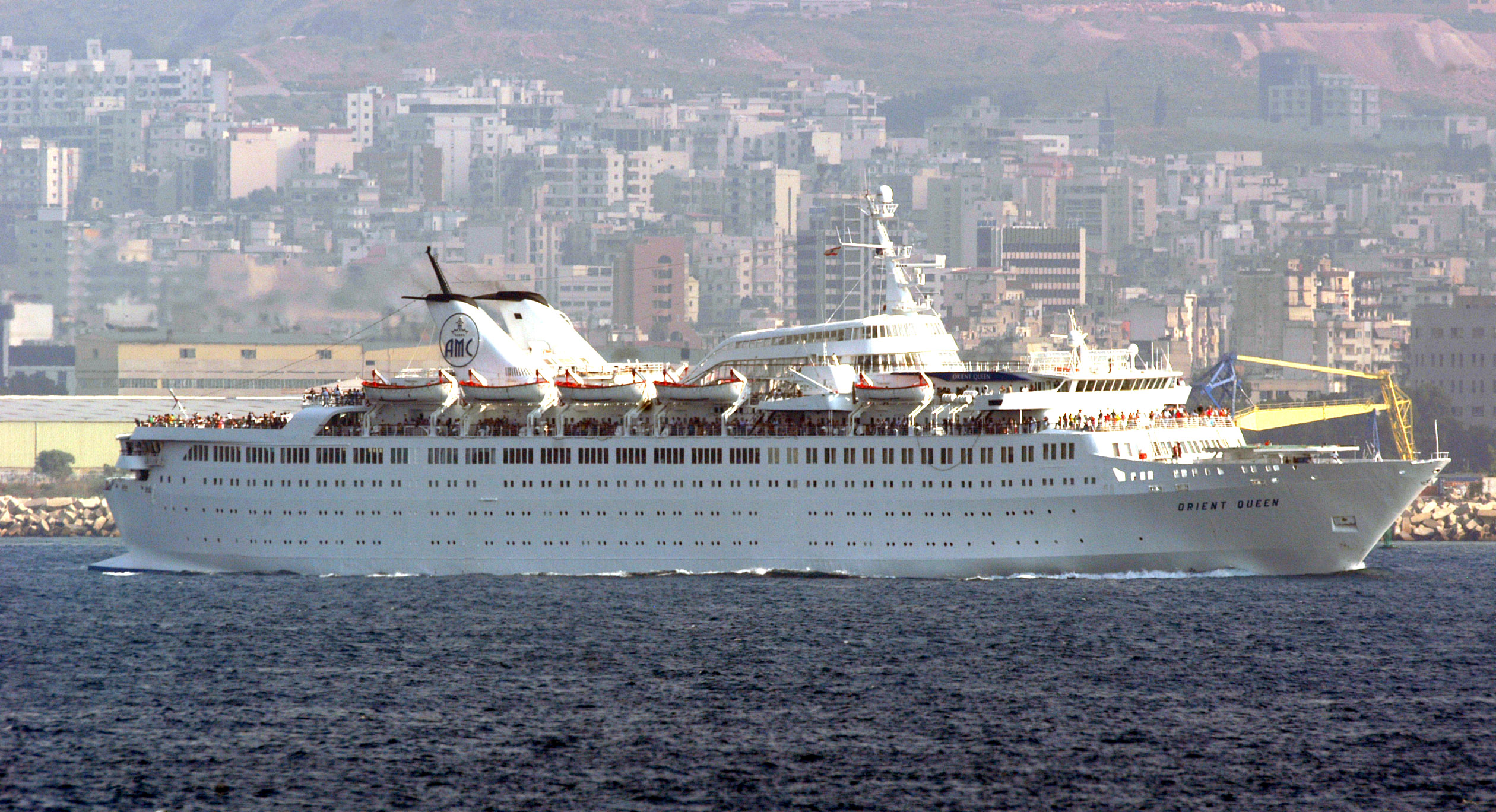
- Starward as Orient Queen in Beirut on 22 July 2006.

History
- Name: 1968–1995: Starward; 1995–2006: Bolero; 2006–2013: Orient Queen; 2013–2017: Louis Aura; 2017–2018: Aegean Queen; 2018–2018: Aegean
- Operator: 1968–1995: Norwegian Caribbean Line; 1995–2001: Festival Cruises; 2001–2004: Spanish Cruise Line; 2004: Eysian Cruise Line; 2004–2006: Abou Merhi Cruises; 2006–2017: Louis Cruise Lines; 2017–2018: Etstur
- Port of registry: 1968–1988: Oslo, Norway; 1988–1995: Nassau, Bahamas; 1995–2006: Panama City, Panama; 2006–2009: Piraeus, Greece; 2009–2011: Majuro, Marshall Islands; 2011–2018: Valletta, Malta; 2018–2018: Malakal, Palau
- Builder: A.G. Weser, Werk Seebeck
- Yard number: 935
- Laid down: 15 January 1967
- Launched: 21 June 1968
- Completed: 30 November 1968
- Maiden voyage: 1968
- In service: 1968
- Out of service: 2018
- Identification: Call sign: 9HA2738; IMO number: 6821080; MMSI number: 215467000
- Fate: Scrapped at Alang, India in 2018.

General characteristics
- Type: cruise ship
- Tonnage: 15,781 GT
- Length: 160.11 m (525 ft 4 in)
- Beam: 22.84 m (74 ft 11 in)
- Draught: 6.7 m (22 ft 0 in)
- Decks: 7 passenger decks, with 414 cabins; 8 decks with 355 cabins
- Speed: 16 knots (30 km/h; 18 mph)
- Capacity: 714/912 as of 2005; 828/910
- Crew: 400

MS Starward was a cruise ship built in 1968 at the AG Weser shipyard in Bremerhaven, West Germany. Originally commissioned for Norwegian Caribbean Line after the success of its first ship, Sunward, Starward was the first purpose-built ship for the newly-established cruise line. In 1995, Starward was sold to Festival Cruises, who renamed the vessel Bolero. The vessel was briefly chartered to Spanish Cruise Line, but was sold to Abou Merhi Cruises, who renamed her Orient Queen, after Festival Cruises was forced to declare bankruptcy in early 2004. In 2006, Louis Cruise Lines bought Orient Queen and kept the name intact. Orient Queen was briefly used by the United States Government in 2006 to evacuate U.S. citizens out of Lebanon due to the conflict between Lebanon and Israel. Louis Cruise Lines renamed the ship to Louis Aura in 2012. In 2017, Etstur, a Turkish travel agency, chartered the ship and renamed it to Aegean Queen. She was sold to for scrap the following year, and was broken up in Alang, India.

== History ==
After the success of Sunward, Knut Kloster, founder and owner of Norwegian Caribbean Line, asked naval architect Tage Wandborg to design an optimum cruise ship for the market. Built at the AG Weser shipyard in Bremerhaven, West Germany, Starward would also have a roll-on/roll-off freight capacity to transport vehicles. During construction, however, the demand for cruises on Sunward greatly exceeded, which prompted Kloster to request Wandborg to change the design and exclude the freight capacity for cabins instead. On 21 December 1968, Starward sailed on its first cruise out of Miami, Florida, United States. Starward was the first Norwegian-flagged ship to meet American ‘Method 1’ fire-protection standards that specified the use of non-combustible materials throughout passenger and crew accommodations.

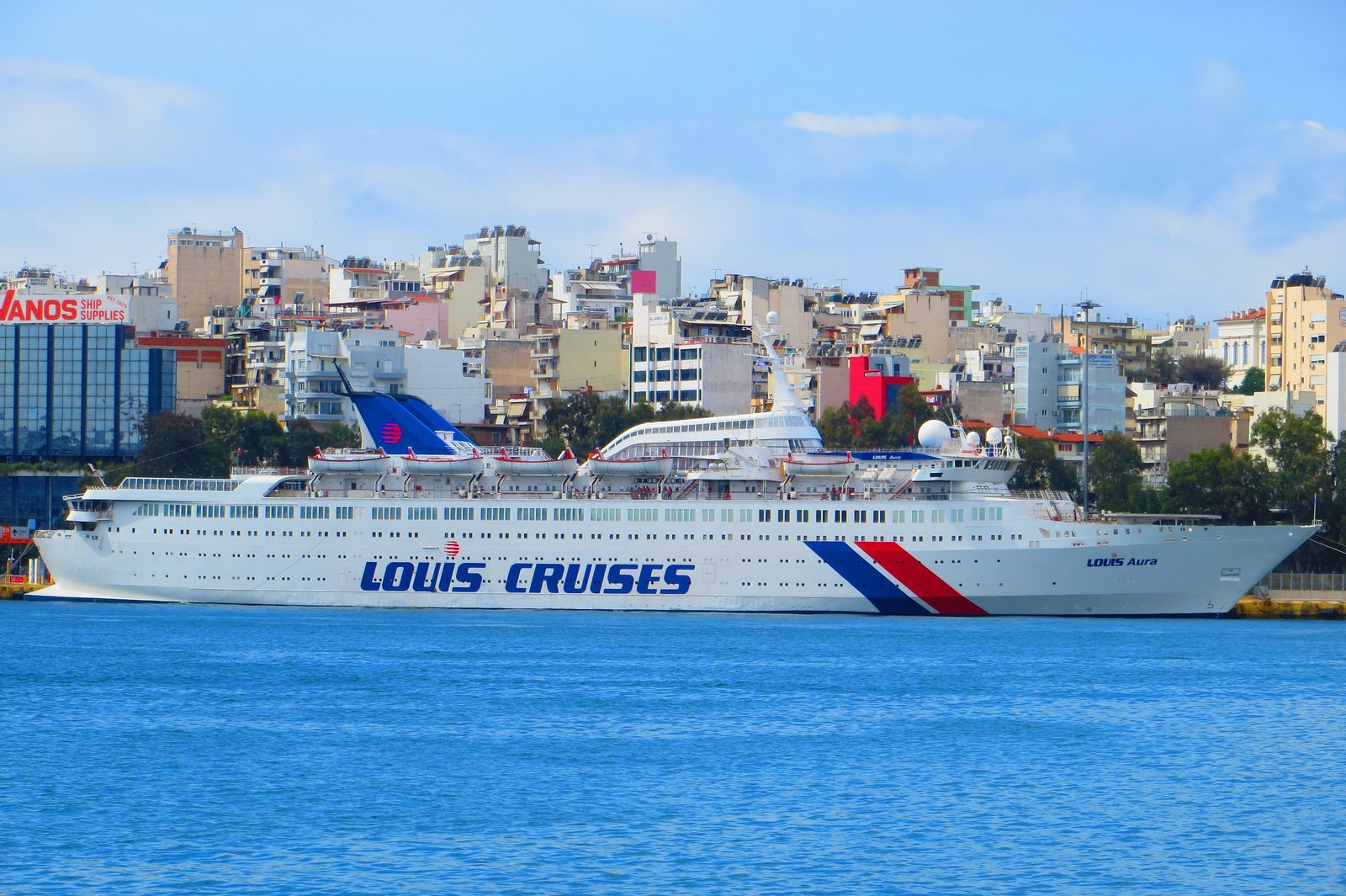
Starward as Louis Aura in the Port of Piraeus

In 1995, Greek line Festival Cruises announced that Starward would be delivered to them from Norwegian Cruise Line in October of the same year, renaming the vessel to Bolero. In 2001, Festival Cruises chartered the ship to Spanish Cruise Line. Following the collapse of Festival Cruises, Bolero was bought by Cruises Elysia in 2004 who sold her on to Abou Merhi Cruises as Orient Queen. She was refitted the following year at a cost of $9.5 million, with the addition of a helicopter pad that was added and managed by Österreichischer Lloyd Ship Management. Orient Queen operated from Beirut for six months with seven-day cruises to Cyprus, Egypt, Greece, and Turkey. In November 2005, the ship was re-positioned in Dubai to begin what was an unsuccessful Persian Gulf cruise program, providing the first luxury cruise line service between Dubai and Gulf Cooperation Council countries. The ship was then positioned in Beirut and scheduled to begin a 2006 cruise season in the Mediterranean Sea.

In July 2006, Orient Queen was used to help evacuate United States citizens from Lebanon because of the ongoing conflict with Israel. Orient Queen was escorted by USS Gonzalez, a U.S. Navy guided missile destroyer, and USS Barry. It took the evacuees to the port of Larnaca in Cyprus.

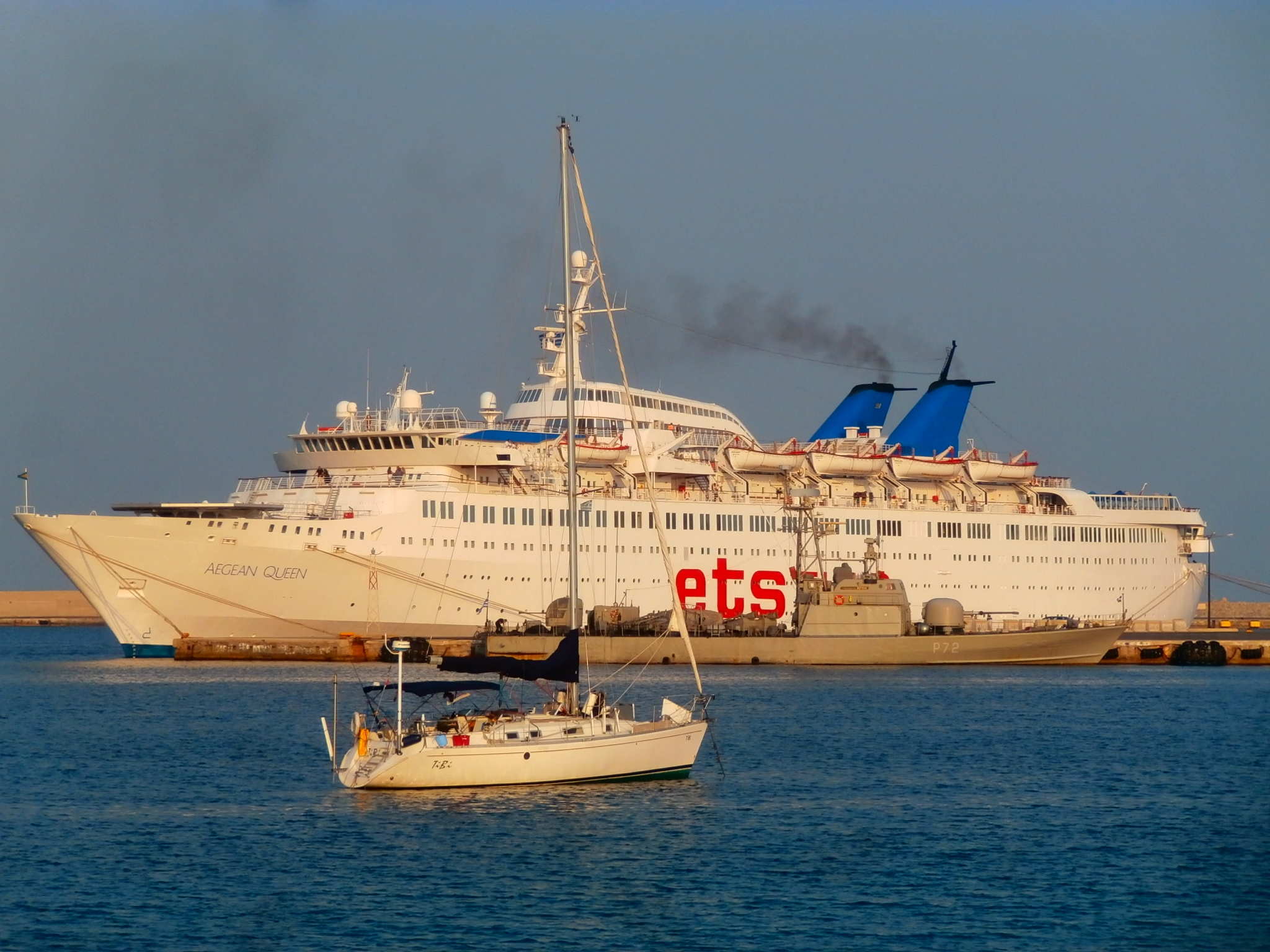
Starward as Aegean Queen in the port of Rhodes (city) on 18 September 2017

In August 2006, Orient Queen was sold to Louis Cruise Lines of Cyprus and operated cruises under the same name. In 2013, Louis Cruise Lines renamed Orient Queen as Louis Aura, which sailed to the Greek Isles from Limassol, Cyprus and Piraeus, Greece. Under the flag of Malta, the ship was owned and operated by the Cyprus-based company Louis Cruises. For the summer season of 2014, the ship executed 3/4/5/6 & 7-day cruises to the Greek Isles departing from Limassol, Cyprus.

In 2017, the Turkish travel agency Etstur chartered the ship. At the end of May 2017, the ship was renamed Aegean Queen after more than a year's layover and returned to service in July 2017. In October 2017, the ship was again out of service near Piraeus. With her 49 years of service, she was one of the longest-serving cruise ships in the world.

In 2018, she was sold for scrap, and was broken up at Alang, India on 17 July 2018.
