= Overseas National Airways =

US supplemental air carrier (1946–1978)

- Overseas National Airways logo
IATA	ICAO	Call sign
OV^{(1)}	OV^{(1)}	ONAIR
- Founded: May 18, 1946; 80 years ago incorporated as Air Travel in California
- Ceased operations: September 15, 1978; 47 years ago
- Operating bases: New York, New York; Wilmington, Ohio; Oakland, California
- Fleet size: See Fleet below
- Headquarters: New York, New York; Washington, DC; San Francisco, California; United States
- Key people: G.F. Steedman Hinckley
- Founder: George W. Tompkins

Notes
- (1) IATA, ICAO codes were the same until the 1980s

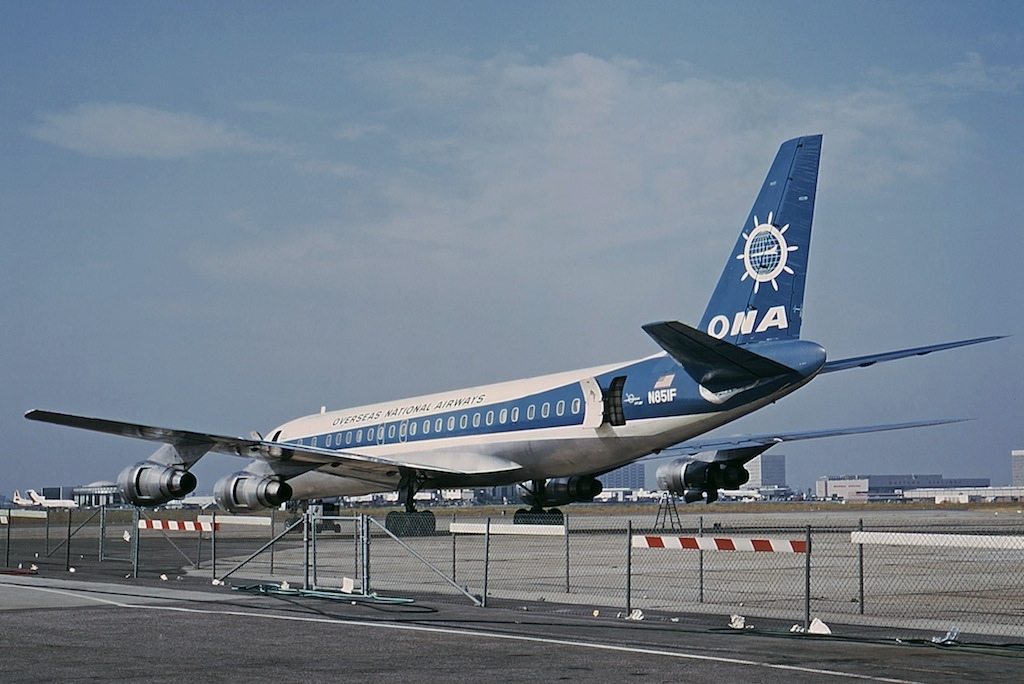
DC-8-50 at Los Angeles

Overseas National Airways (ONA) was a supplemental air carrier (also known as an irregular air carrier or a non-scheduled carrier) during the period in which the Civil Aeronautics Board (CAB), a now defunct United States Federal agency, tightly regulated almost all US commercial air transport. From 1964 onward, supplemental carriers were charter carriers, but until 1964 they were charter-scheduled hybrids. Until 1950, ONA was known as Calasia Air Transport, and until 1947, Air Travel.

ONA was effectively two distinct carriers, separated by a two-year interval in 1963–1965 during which it fell into bankruptcy and became almost completely moribund, after which it was reconstituted by new ownership/management. From 1969 through the mid-1970s, ONA was one of the largest charter carriers in the United States, engaged in diverse activities including building the Mississippi Queen paddlewheel riverboat. However, in its last years the carrier faced increasing competition, uncertainty and poor financial results and in 1975–1977 suffered the loss of three aircraft in accidents within a 16-month period, including two DC-10s within two months. The carrier chose to liquidate in 1978 outside bankruptcy.

== History ==
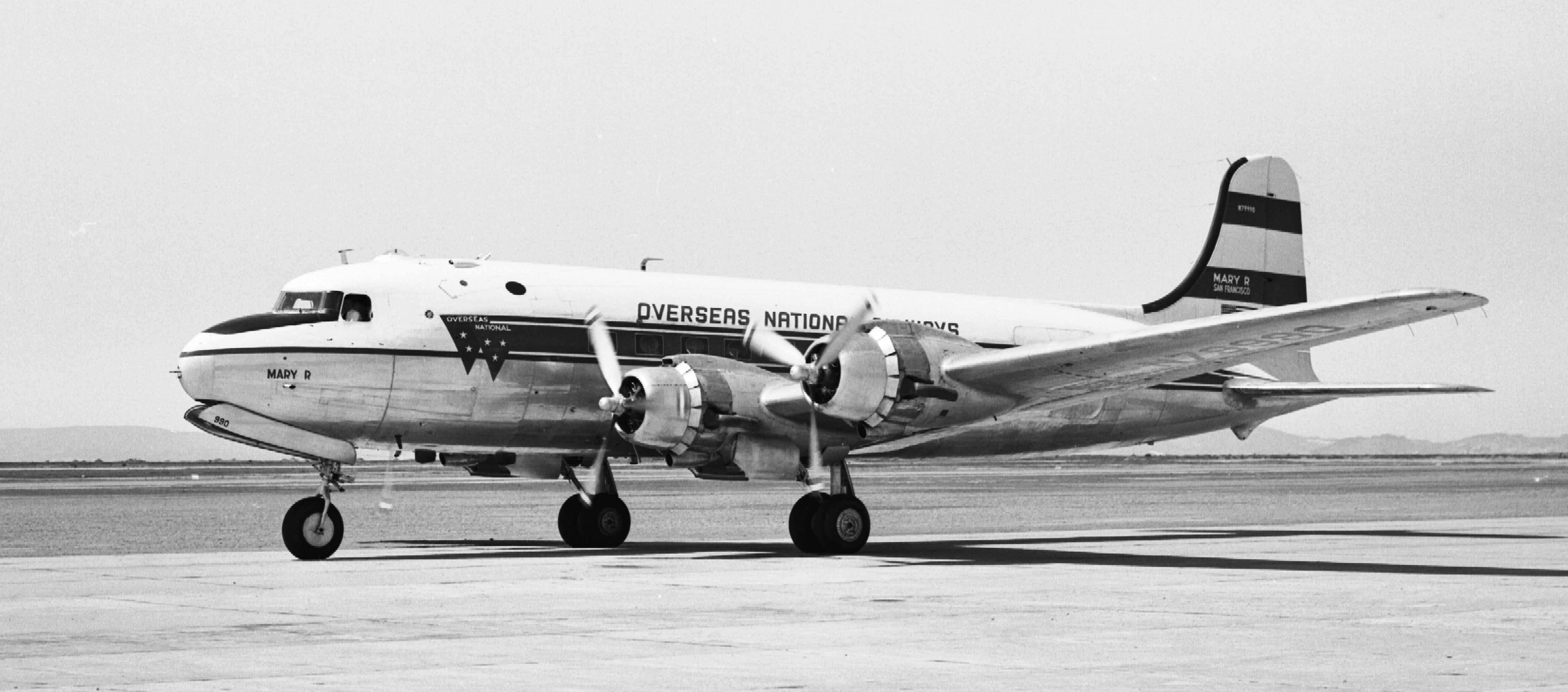
DC-4

=== Early days ===
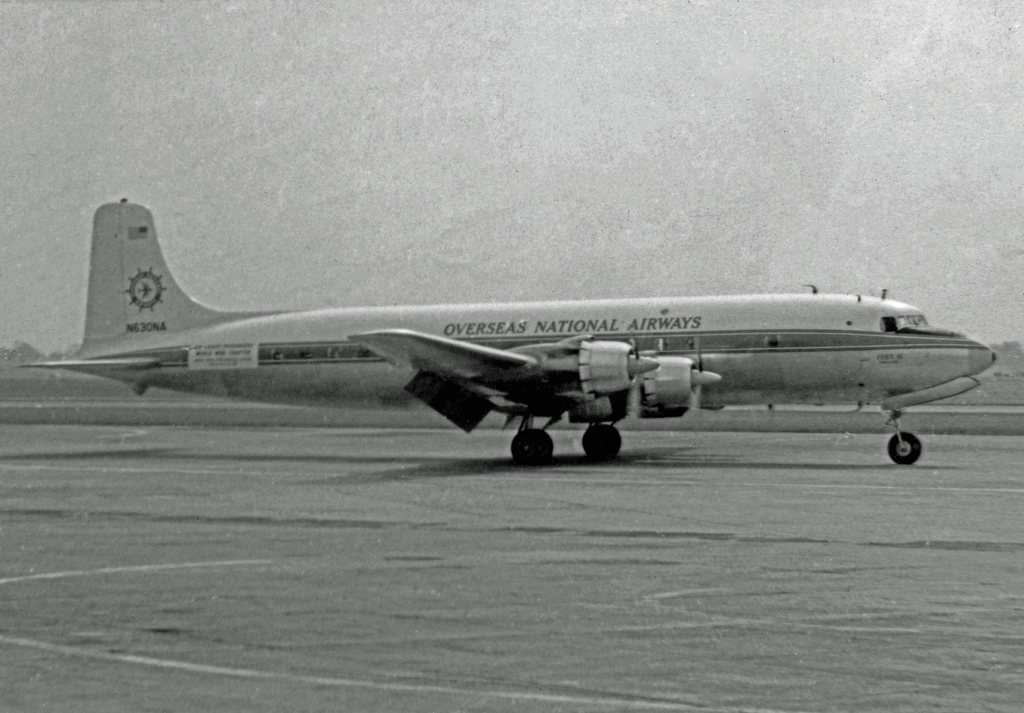
DC-6A at Manchester, UK, 1958

San Francisco-based Air Travel was incorporated in California on May 18, 1946 by George W. Tompkins, a former World War II Navy transport pilot who obtained a war surplus C-54 through preferences for returning veterans. In 1947, Air Travel became Calasia Air Transport. The carrier was issued its "Letter of Registration" on 12 August 1947 (in lieu of certificate, as was standard for irregular airlines at the time). Also in 1947, Calasia started operating its fleet of five leased C-54s under contract to Transocean Air Lines until January 1950. In July 1950, Overseas National Airways was incorporated in Delaware, and ONA started operating in the Pacific under contract to the Military Air Transport Service (MATS) (North Korean troops crossed into South Korea on June 25, 1950). In 1954, ONA was an applicant in a CAB case in which Seaboard & Western Airlines was certificated as a scheduled transatlantic cargo carrier. ONA was judged able but not as able as Seaboard, which, based on 1953 data was about three times the size of ONA, whether by fleet (12 DC-4s vs 4) or revenues. ONA's 1953 revenue was 100% military, split 52/48 passenger/cargo.

=== Military charter carrier ===
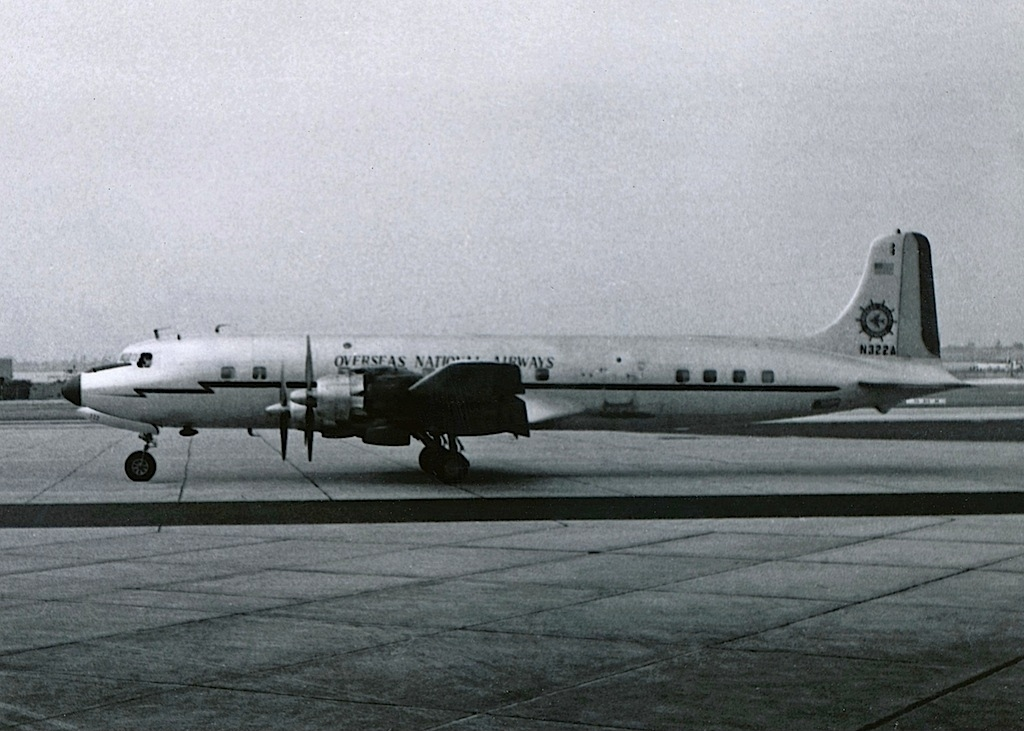
DC-7 San Diego 1961

The CAB tightly regulated almost all commercial air transportation in the US, intentionally suppressing competition including regulating all fares as well as determining where scheduled airlines flew.

Until 1960, a major exception in this regime were military charter contracts, which were competitively bid. The CAB had to accept this situation because the US military permitted so-called Part 45 carriers to bid for military charters. Part 45 airlines were not common carriers (did not offer services to the public), and thus escaped CAB regulation. Any attempt by the CAB to impose minimum military charter bids on CAB-regulated carriers could be undercut by Part 45s. Thus military charters were a competitive free-for all. In 1959, for instance, the US military invited 97 carriers to bid for charter work.

This was relevant to ONA because until 1963, it was almost entirely a military charter carrier. In only three years did it have significant civil (commercial) business (see Table 1), including running 140 transatlantic charters in 1959. Once the Korean War was over in 1953, ONA was unable to sustain its financial performance which degraded substantially by the end of the decade. In 1959 ONA bid so aggressively for international MATS contracts that it won over half the awards by dollar value, stripping Trans World Airlines (TWA) and Pan Am of their former MATS business. To handle the volume, ONA leased nine DC-7s to augment its core fleet of four DC-6s. As Table 1 shows, 1960 ONA revenue increased dramatically from 1959, but it also suffered a substantial loss.

Table 1: Overseas National Airways Financial Results, 1952 thru 1960(1) Among supplemental air carriers
USD 000	1952	1953	1954	1955	1956	1957	1958	1959	1960
Operating revenue	4,348	4,272	1,547	2,042	2,075	3,557	6,792	10,639	23,985
Profit (loss) before tax	119	290	18	243	(60)	(318)	(401)	(1,689)	(2,087)
% of operating revenue:									
Military charter		100.0	99.6	100.0	96.1	64.4	45.2	76.0	98.1
Civilian charter		0.0	0.0	0.0	3.9	35.6	45.4	20.1	0.7
Scheduled		0.0	0.4	0.0	0.0	0.0	1.7	0.6	0.3
Other		0.0	0.0	0.0	0.0	0.0	7.8	3.3	1.0
Operating revenue:									
% of industry^{(1)}	6.1	6.1	2.8	2.7	3.1	7.0	10.4	13.9	28.7
Industry^{(1)} rank	3	3	13	10	14	4	4	3	1

ONA's 1960 gambit contributed to a substantial change in military charter contracting. US scheduled carriers had long been unhappy with competitive MATS bidding. ONA's audacious bid motivated TWA, Pan Am and others to press their case with the military, Congress and the CAB. Separately, in February 1960, a report to President Eisenhower recommended, among other things, and the President approved, that Part 45 carriers be excluded from international MATS bidding. With Part 45s no longer a factor, in July 1960 the CAB said it no longer accept competitive bidding for military business. The CAB duly set a minimum rate for international MATS flying. With price no longer a variable, MATS ranked bidders according to their ability to provide (1) turbine (jet or turboprop) equipment with cargo capability, (2) turbine equipment (3) piston equipment with cargo capability in that order. In 1960, no supplemental carrier had long-range turbine equipment (even in 1964, all supplementals together had only six such aircraft, against 427 among the scheduled carriers) so this substantially advantaged the scheduled carriers. When the first set of bids was announced later in 1960 subject to these criteria, Pan Am was on top with 20.5% of the dollar value and TWA was second with 18.6%. ONA's share was 8.5%.

ONA of this era had its main operational base at Oakland, a smaller base in New York and a small headquarters in Washington, DC.

=== 1963–1965 bankruptcy and rebirth ===
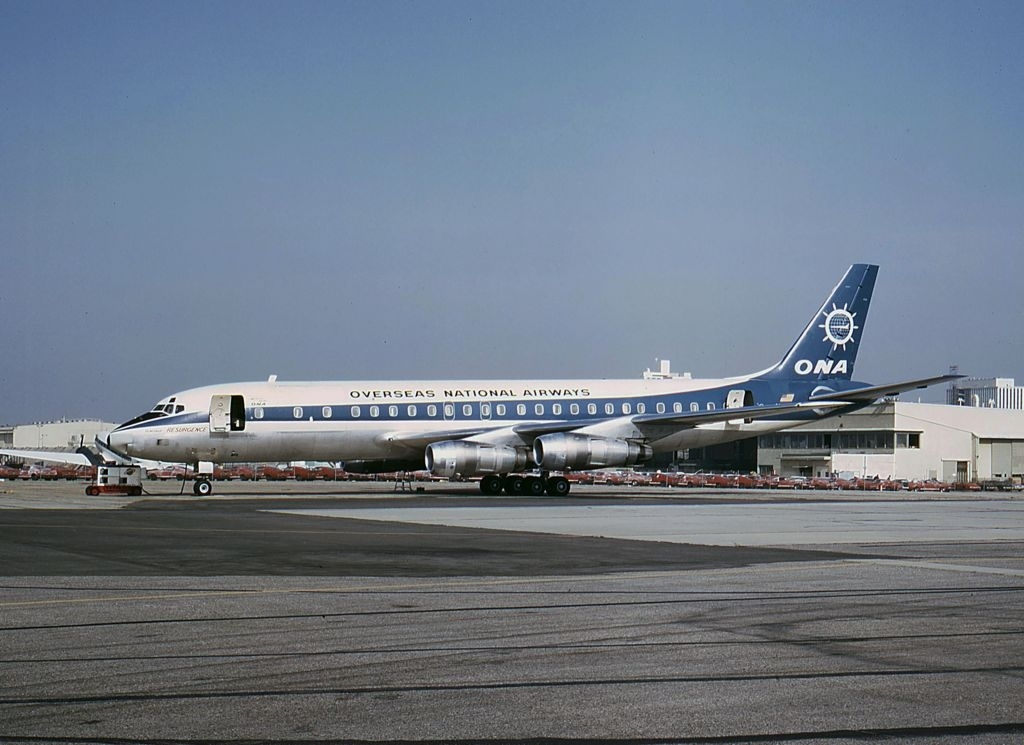
DC-8 Los Angeles 1967. The aircraft carried the name Resurgence

In October 1963, George Tompkins said that supplementals didn't work without military business and ONA was having trouble obtaining it. October 1963 was eventful for ONA: operations ceased on the 4th and the company entered bankruptcy on the 28th. Tompkins's bankruptcy affidavit noted jets rendered ONA's fleet obsolete. Liabilities were $3.5 million (about $36 million in 2024 dollars), assets only $0.5mm. Ironically, in the same month, the CAB selected ONA as one of three supplementals to receive transatlantic charter authority (eliminating the need to ask CAB permission for each such charter) and sent the recommendation to the White House for required approval. In February 1964, when President Johnson signed off, the CAB had still not revised the selection to account for ONA's defunct state. The White House noticed and Johnson declined that part of the recommendation. Also in February, Tompkins took a position at a Fort Lauderdale real estate firm.

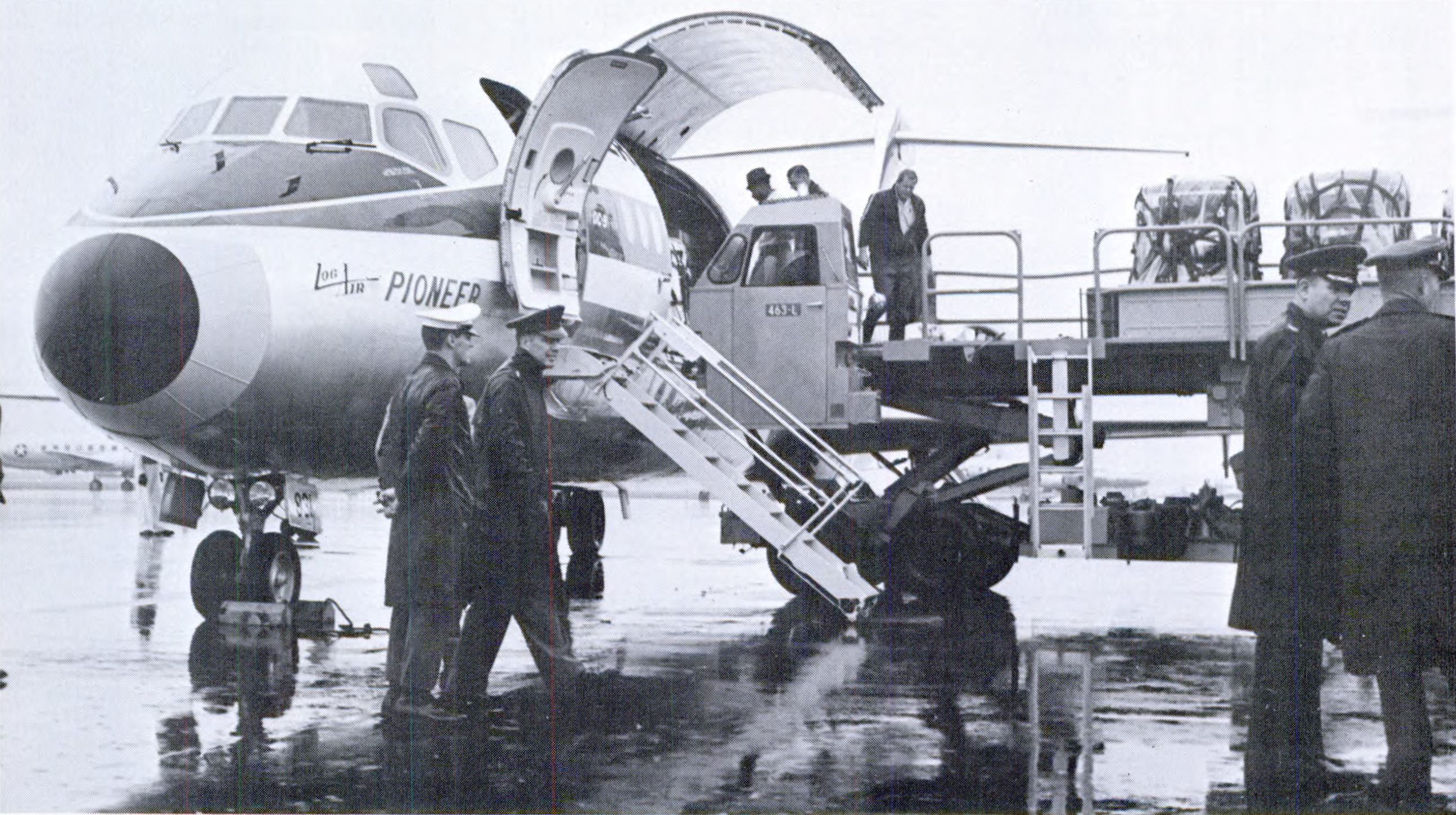
Logair DC-9-30CF at Wright Patterson Air Force Base 1967/1968

G.F. Steedman Hinckley was a former ONA pilot and executive. Hinckley was from old money (his birth was announced in society pages and he dated Rockefeller debutantes). (the Flight 032 video in External links contains a brief clip of Hinckley speaking after the crash). Louis Marx Jr (son of toy tycoon Louis Marx), was a Princeton classmate. Marx was a childhood friend of Dan Lufkin, of Donaldson, Lufkin & Jenrette (in which Marx invested). Marx and Lufkin were among Hinckley's partners in funding ONA's July 1965 bankruptcy exit and October 1965 resumption of operations, when Hinckley was just 33 years old. Many former ONA employees returned including George Tompkins as chairman. Retired Hall of Fame baseball player Hank Greenberg was on the board. Hinckley believed the superior economics, speed and comfort of jets would boost air travel and increase demand for commercial charters. In April 1966, the CAB gave ONA the right to fly Atlantic charters. The CAB had a strong preference for jets and ONA had two DC-8s coming for summer 1966 whereas two supplementals that already had Atlantic rights, American Flyers Airline and Saturn Airways, had yet to obtain such equipment. ONA also secured a contract through the Military Airlift Command (MAC), successor to MATS. Jet operations started June 1966.

=== Success ===
As Table 2 shows, ONA was immediately profitable in 1966, followed by two more highly profitable high-growth years. 1969 was less profitable, but in that year, ONA was the second largest supplemental by revenue, behind only World Airways. At the end of 1966, ONA had two DC-8-55Fs and four DC-7s, with a DC-8-63 on order and two optioned. In June 1967, ONA completed an initial public offering, raising over $10 million (over $90 million in 2024 terms). By year end, the airline added cargo DC-9s to its fleet for the US Air Force Logair domestic cargo contract. In January 1968, it committed to eight Lockheed L-188 Electra turboprop cargo conversions. In June 1969, ONA ordered three DC-10s, with three options, launching, with Trans International Airlines, a convertible (passenger/freight) version of the DC-10 that became known as the DC-10-30CF. In 1970, ONA had a fleet of five DC-9 freighters, four DC-9 passenger aircraft, eight Electra turboprop aircraft and five DC-8s, of which three were stretch models (60-series DC-8s). In 1972, when ONA announced its new maintenance base in Wilmington, Ohio (discussed below), part of the rationale was it was to be an operational center for its DC-9 and Electra domestic cargo business, both military and the flying of car parts for Ford from Detroit Willow Run Airport.

Table 2: Overseas National Airways Financial Results, 1965 thru 1978^{(1)}(1) Airline only, as filed with the CAB(2) Among supplemental air carriers
USD 000	1965	1966	1967	1968	1969	1970	1971	1972	1973	1974	1975	1976	1977	1978
Operating revenue:														
Military charter	147	5,034	10,510	15,157	25,586	28,459	26,551		23,805	23,521	21,612	17,993	9,963	4,298
Civilian charter	67	5,535	8,364	14,051	29,674	27,572	26,811	34,013	45,336	53,694	64,830	62,441	69,482	20,513
Non-transport	2	37	324	485	529	1,173	2,427		39	5,510	8,680	7,627	8,522	3,846
Total	216	10,606	19,198	29,693	55,789	57,204	55,789	64,504	69,181	82,725	95,121	88,060	87,969	28,659
Op profit (loss)	(287)	1,637	2,396	5,559	1,920	1,195	511	(1,145)	(6,313)	564	(379)	(12,661)	(187)	(4,170)
Net profit (loss)	(479)	907	1,209	3,304	(677)	3,927	(630)		(4,474)	2,062	1,671	(3,922)	(12,437)	7,041
Op margin (%)	−132.9	15.4	12.5	18.7	3.4	2.1	0.9	−1.8	−9.1	0.7	−0.4	−14.4	−0.2	−14.6
Industry rank^{(2)}	12	6	6	6	2	2	4	2	3	3	2	2	3	5

=== Diversification ===
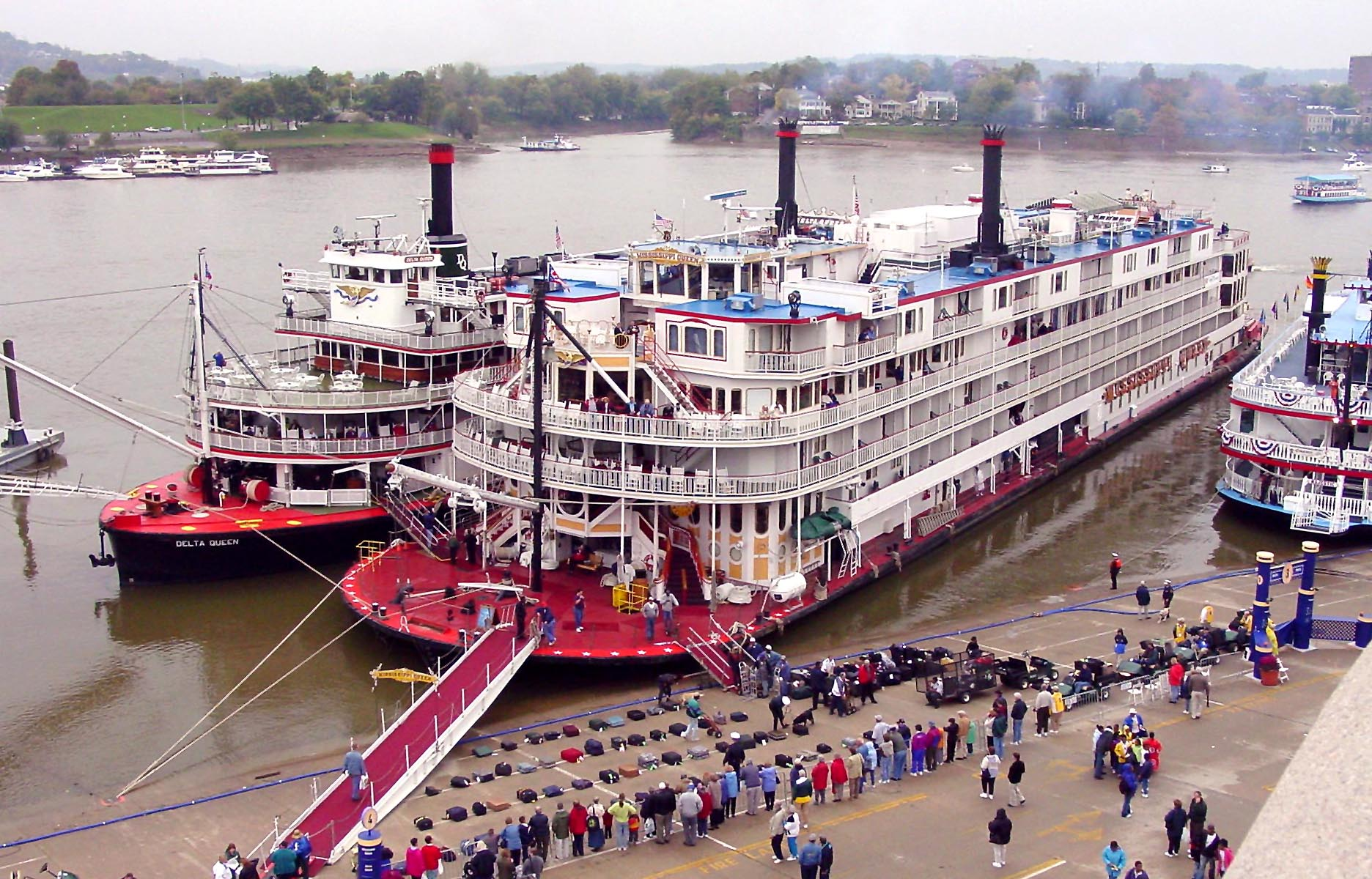
ONA owned the Delta Queen (left) 1969–1976 and built the Mississippi Queen (center; inaugurated 1976)

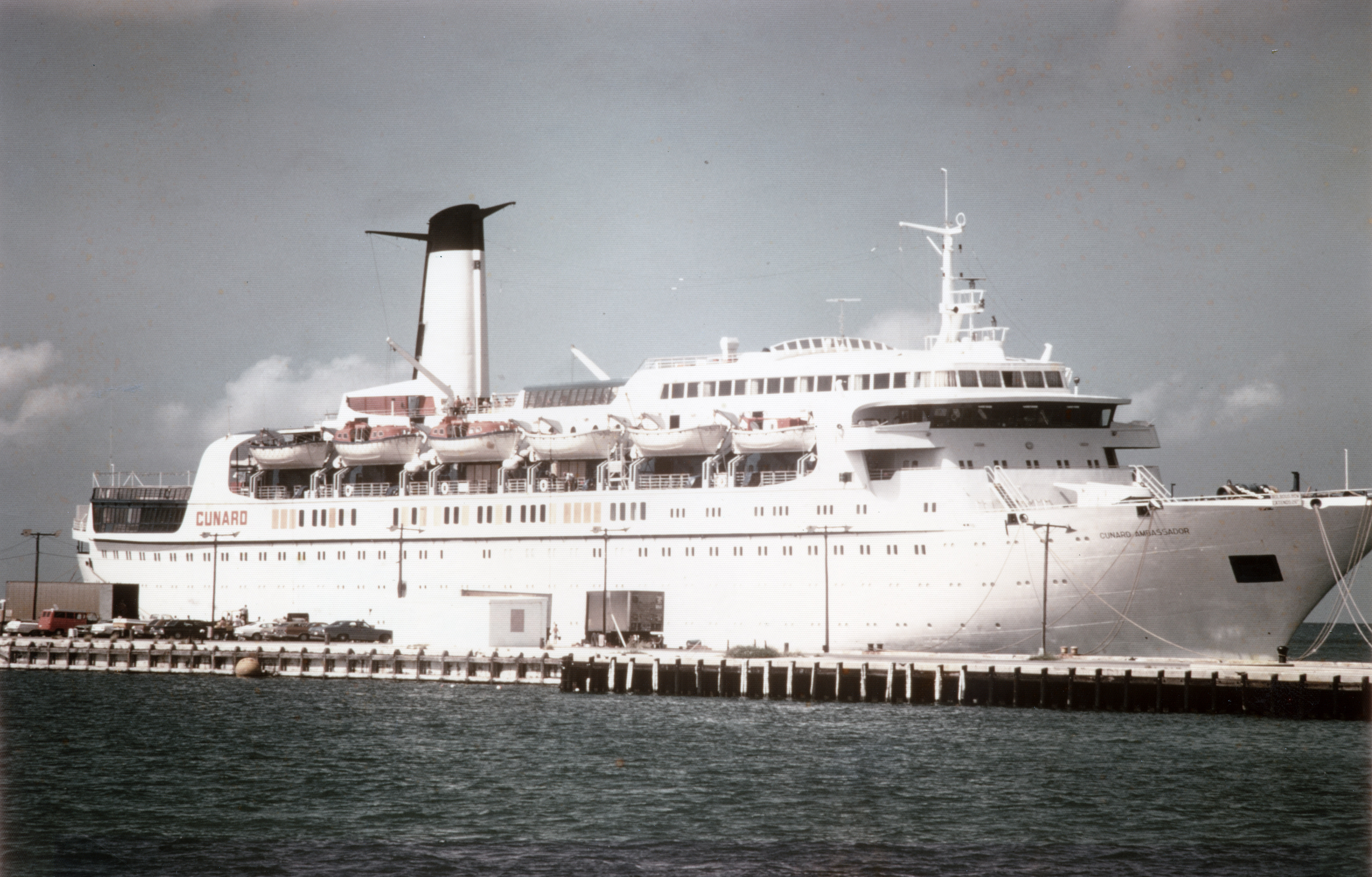
MV Cunard Ambassador, the second of two ONA-commissioned cruise ships, at Key West 1974. The first was MV Cunard Adventurer.

ONA diversified outside of airlines. In October 1968 it announced participation in construction of a 400-room hotel in Nassau, Bahamas. In 1969, ONA ordered a cruise ship (with options for two more), to sail the Mediterranean in summer and Caribbean in winter. Also in 1969, it bought the Delta Queen paddlewheel riverboat. Another subsidiary was Automated Terminal Services, providing ground handling for the Navy's Quicktrans domestic cargo program with about 400 employees in 1970. The hotel and cruise ships came to a quick end. Extrication from the hotel resulted in significant writeoffs in 1971 and 1972. Since cruise ships are also common carriers, operating such required CAB approval and the examiner was not favorable. ONA entered a joint venture with Cunard to operate the ship, but a disappointing 1969 and tough first quarter 1970 left ONA cash hungry, so, soon after ordering a second ship, ONA sold out to Cunard, freeing substantial liquidity and over $6 million in capital gains, but disappointing Hinckley. The riverboat investment lasted longer. Starting in 1973, ONA funded (with the aid of a government loan) the construction (for over $20 million—over $100 million in 2024 terms) of a larger boat, the Mississippi Queen, which started operation in 1976. Hinckley's brother Albert (an architect) ran the project, but by its first voyage in 1976, ONA had sold the riverboats to the Coca-Cola Bottling Company of New York.

=== Atlantic dependence ===
In the last decade of the regulated era (ending 1978), the critical civilian market for US supplemental airlines was Europe. In 1976 the CAB noted the transatlantic market accounted for about 75% of global supplemental operations. By 1969 ONA was already the largest supplemental on the Atlantic (by revenue and by number of passengers flown) with transatlantic revenue of $22.8 million, or 77% of the civilian charter revenue shown for 1969 in Table 2. In September 1974, the CAB noted the Atlantic accounted for 99% of ONA civilian passenger revenue. The CEO of Universal Airlines (another large supplemental of the era) attributed its 1972 demise to inability to secure finance in the face of a CAB attempt to strip it of Atlantic rights. With the exception of tiny Johnson Flying Service, bought by Evergreen Helicopters in 1975, all of ONA's mid-1960s supplemental contemporaries without Atlantic rights ceased operations (Standard in 1969, Purdue in 1971, Modern in 1975, McCulloch in 1977). Lack of other big US charter markets frustrated ONA. It lobbied the CAB with a detailed white paper calling for US adoption of European-type inclusive tour rules, noting that in 1972, European charter airlines flew 8.5 million such passengers, while restrictive CAB rules limited the US inclusive tour market to just 100,000.

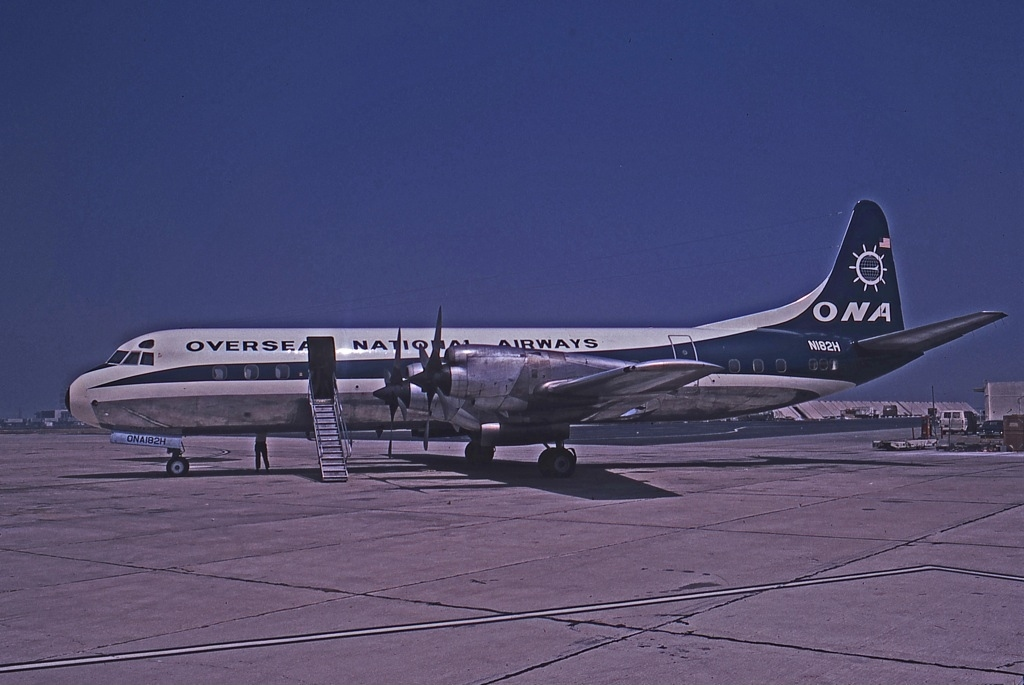
Electra Los Angeles 1971

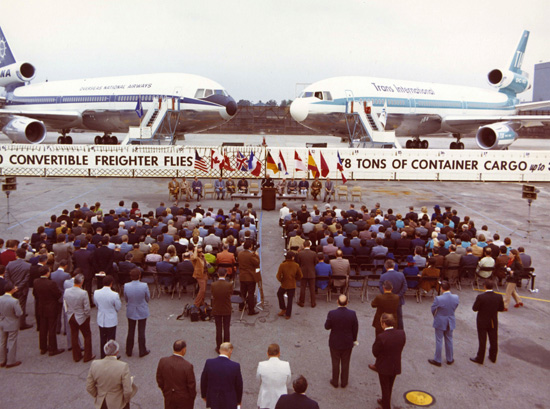
Joint delivery of DC-10-30CFs with Trans International Long Beach 1973

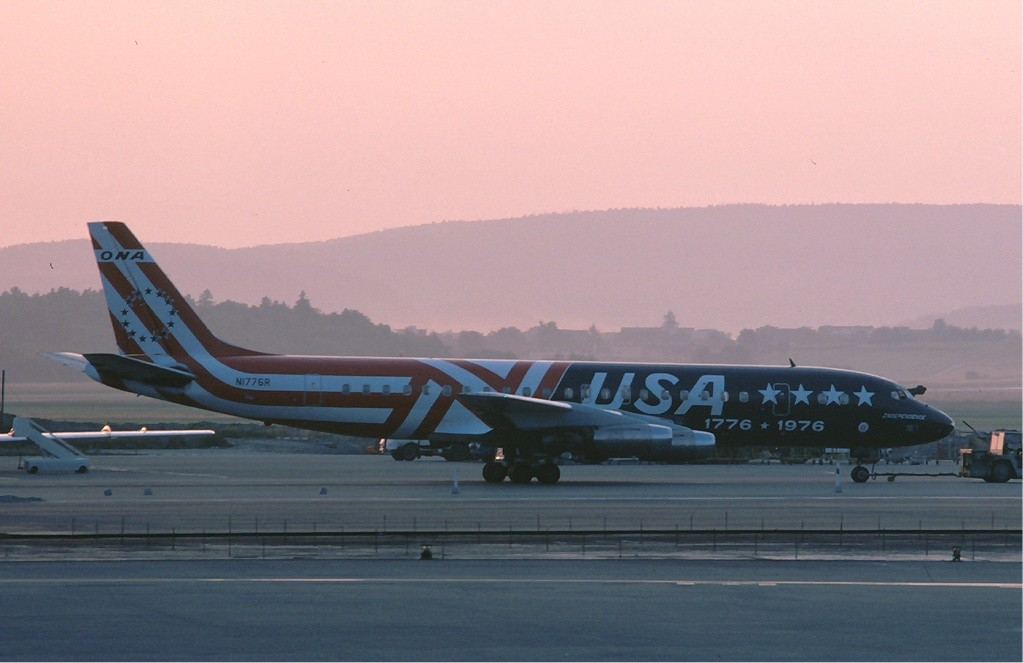
DC-8 Zurich 1975, one of two ONA bicentennial liveries

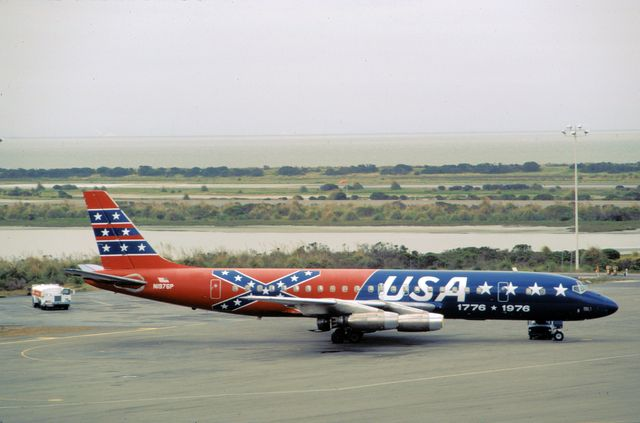
The other bicentennial livery

=== Fleet changes ===
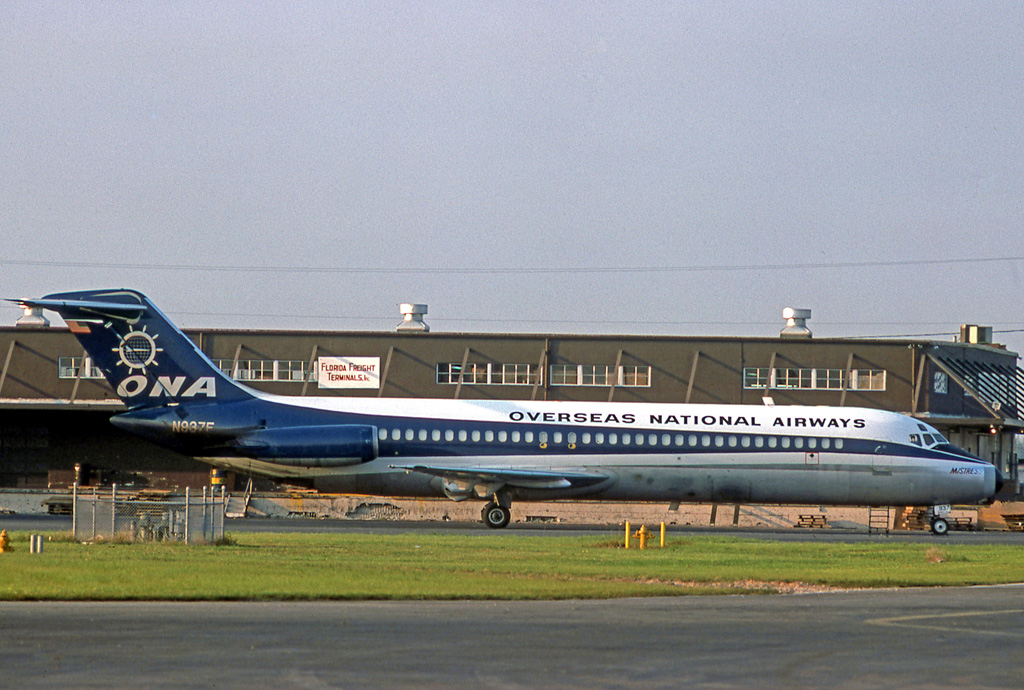
DC-9 Miami 1976

ONA's fleet changed significantly over its last five years.

- In 1973, two DC-10s delivered, bringing widebodies for the summer season. But ONA also started acquiring used early-model DC-8-20/30 aircraft (powered by less efficient turbojets rather than turbofans) and retrofitting them for high-density seating at the Ohio maintenance base.
- In 1974, the Electras left the fleet. As previously related, one rationale for the Ohio maintenance base was to be an operational center for the freight operation. ONA had 10 Electras in the fleet at year-end 1973, still had seven at August 1, 1974, but the fleet was gone by year end.
- An involuntary change was the loss of its two DC-10s within two months in November 1975 and January 1976 (see Accidents below for details), abruptly leaving ONA without widebodies.
- In 1976, the DC-9s were traded in as part of the deal to get replacement DC-10s. ONA was no longer in the domestic cargo business. Also, by year end, ONA stopped flying DC-8-20/30 aircraft, after effectively only three years of operation (these aircraft flew minimal hours in 1973, their year of introduction).
- In 1977, two replacement DC-10s arrived in time for summer. The simplified fleet of DC-10s and stretch DC-8s did far better than the prior year (see Table 2). Simplifying further, ONA grounded the remaining DC-8s at year end, going into 1978 a pure DC-10 operator, with a third DC-10 due for summer high season.

=== Regulatory uncertainty ===
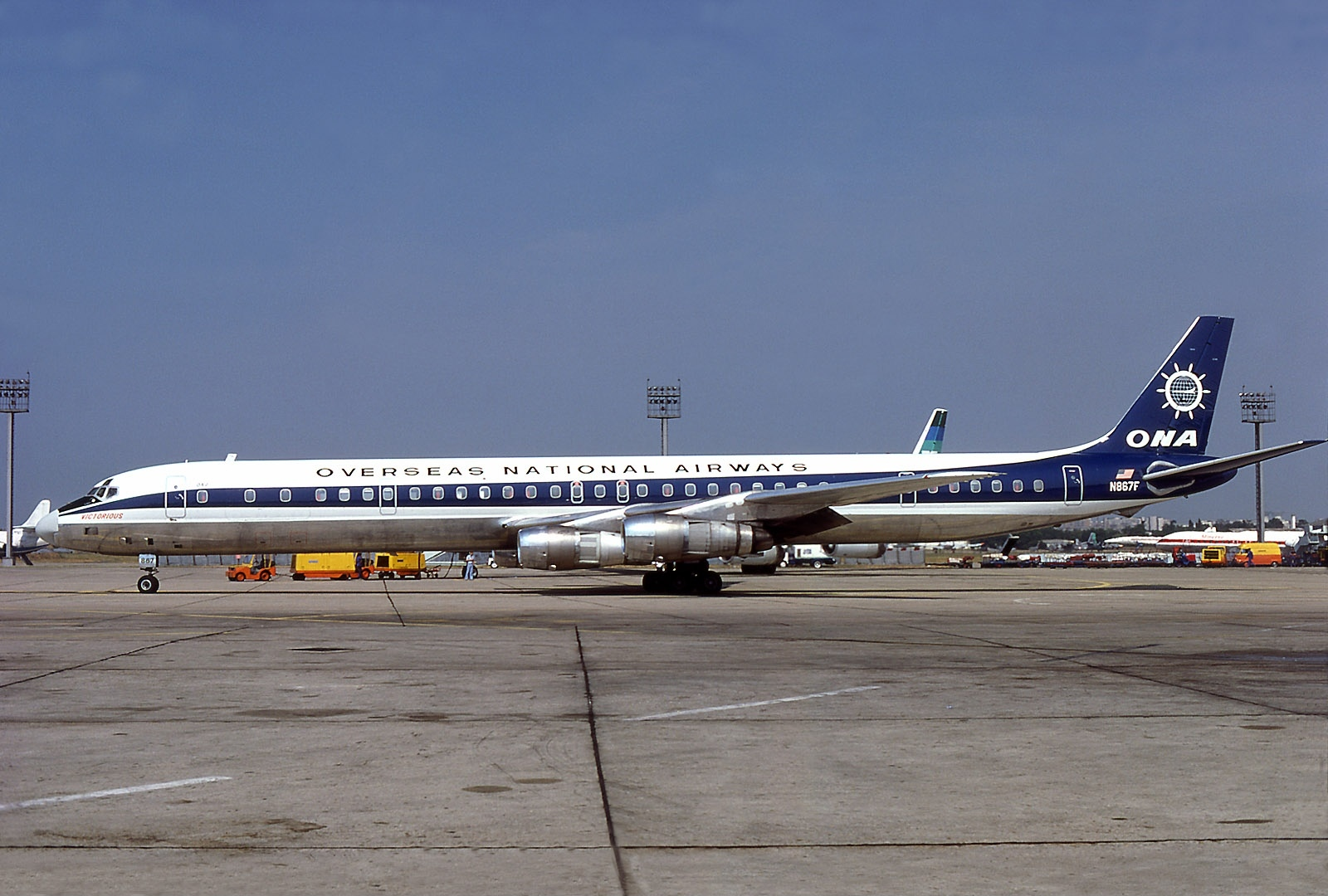
DC-8-61CF Paris 1976

1975–1978 was a period of profound airline regulatory change, starting with Senator Ted Kennedy's 1975 Senate hearings on the CAB and the appointment of two pro-competition CAB chairs, John E. Robson (1975) and Alfred E. Kahn (1977). In October 1978 President Carter signed the Airline Deregulation Act, which initiated U.S. airline deregulation on 1 January 1979.

Effective September 1975, the CAB approved the one-stop charter (OTC), the Europe-type inclusive tour charter ONA wanted. OTCs had a big impact in 1976, especially in Hawaii and Las Vegas, and in October 1976, the CAB approved a further relaxation of charter rules, approving the ABC (the advance booking charter), another Hinckley desire. Other than booking in advance and through a tour operator, ABCs were little different than a scheduled flight. The New York Times, and others, proclaimed the future belonged to charters. As the country debated deregulation, Hinckley wanted a protected niche for supplementals, he did not believe they could survive head-on competition with the scheduled airlines. Past experience showed scheduled airlines could crush charter carriers. For instance, in the late 1960s, supplementals built a successful charter business to Hawaii, only for it to evaporate when the CAB permitted scheduled carriers to offer low group fares that grabbed the business. US scheduled airlines had many empty seats: the CAB set a policy of aiming for 55% loadfactors, trying to increase them from a level closer to 50%. In 1976, it was the scheduled airlines that benefitted from OTCs, carrying 28% more passengers on charters in 1976 (5.2 million) than 1975. By comparison, supplementals carried 7% fewer passengers (2.2 million) in 1976. In March 1977, American Airlines (then mainly a domestic carrier) in response to ABCs, launched supersaver fares, offering deep discounts in return for charter-like restrictions such as advance booking and a week-long stay requirement. By the end of summer 1977, supersavers destroyed the market for domestic ABCs.

=== Laker ===
From June 1971 Laker Airways, a UK charter carrier, attempted to gain approval for its Skytrain concept: reservationless scheduled service between New York and London for a charter fare. ONA consistently opposed Laker's attempts. But in late 1976 the British government backed Laker as the second carrier permitted under the UK air service treaty with the US. In June 1977 the CAB authorized Laker's service, which launched in September. Incumbents responded with low fares of their own, including Atlantic markets outside New York-London. Europe-New York deep discount travel increased over 300% in the first quarter of 1978. The overall New York-London market expanded by 39% in the six months ending March 1978. This undermined the rationale for charters, and some tour operators started going out of business.

=== Liquidation ===
By 1976, ONA was considering exit strategies. In February the Coca-Cola Bottling Company of New York made an offer for ONA, but ultimately contented itself with buying the riverboat operation, as mentioned above. Still seeking a partner, ONA received an offer in September from Alaska International Air (AIA; later known as Markair), an Alaska intrastate airline operating Lockheed L-100 Hercules aircraft. The similarity with the then-pending merger between Hercules operator Saturn and Trans International was noted. For AIA, the attraction was using the ONA certificate to fly to the rest of the US. But the offer depended on AIA finding funding, and lenders were wary of supplemental carriers. The deal died in December.

In October 1977, Steedman Hinckley resigned, pushed out. ONA shares, which had once traded over $45, traded for only a couple dollars in 1977. Dominant shareholders were still Louis Marx and Dan Lufkin. Under a new non-airline leader, the airline grounded its DC-8s (as previously mentioned) and eliminated all remaining non-airline activity. An early 1978 strike at McDonnell Douglas delayed delivery of ONA's third DC-10, with planned delivery shifting to October from June, thereby missing the 1978 high season. ONA sold the undelivered DC-10 and said it would ground, at least temporarily, the other two DC-10s after the high season. ONA and other supplementals were seeing tour program cancellations well above normal. ONA emphasized it was able to pay its bills, given its cash reserve. Later that summer, it confirmed it was going out of business. The downturn in traffic and collapse in pricing meant that even with the third DC-10, the carrier would have lost money. It was able to sell the DC-10s at a significant gain over book value, ensuring a return for shareholders. The airline simply did not believe it could compete with discounts offered by scheduled airlines. Last day was September 15.

== Legacy ==
Steedman Hinckley went on to almost immediately create a second, separately certificated Overseas National Airways, which eventually was renamed National Airlines. The activities of that second airline are sometimes confused with the original; there were aircraft that operated for both versions. Any aircraft operating for "Overseas National Airways" 1978 or before was doing so for the original ONA. Any aircraft operating for "Overseas National Airways" in 1979 or later was doing that for the second version.

== Wilmington Air Park base ==
From 1972 to 1977, ONA had a maintenance base at Wilmington Air Park in Ohio, as part of which, it also controlled the airfield. ONA moved functionality to Wilmington from a prior base in Norfolk, Virginia. Employment peaked at 140 in early 1976. Among other duties, the base performed the complete interior reconfigurations of several DC-8s purchased from Eastern Air Lines, moving galleys and lavatories to accommodate high density seating. The base also handled dispatch of the domestic cargo fleet, which operated for the US Air Force Logair system, and also delivered car parts. ONA shut the base after it disposed of the DC-8s. The assets were sold to an independent maintenance organization called Ohio Air Center, which took over in November 1977.

== ONA DC-10s ==
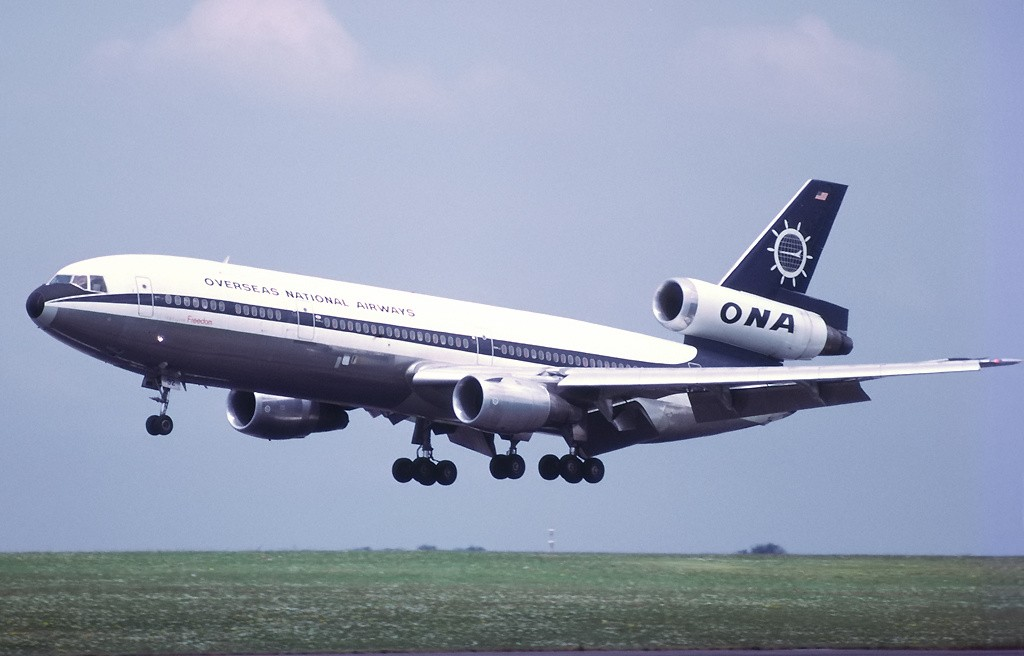
N1032F, the ONA DC-10 which crashed at JFK following a bird strike as Flight 032 in 1975

ONA ordered five DC-10s, but the last delivered the week ONA ceased operations and was earlier sold to Seaboard World. The other four were destroyed in accidents, the two ONA accidents discussed in the Accidents section and two others after ONA was dissolved. Of the four accidents, only one was fatal:

- 13 September 1982: Spantax Flight 995, a tire on the DC-10 disintegrated on takeoff at Madrid Barajas Airport, leading to a late rejected takeoff, loss of control, aircraft destruction and the death of 50 out of 394 people on board.
- 23 December 1983: At Anchorage Ted Stevens International Airport, a Korean Air Lines crew became disoriented in fog and attempted to take off on the wrong runway, crashing their DC-10 into a small aircraft. There were no fatalities but the DC-10 was destroyed.

The Spantax (serial number 46962) and Korean Air Lines (serial number 46960) aircraft were delivered to ONA in June and May 1977 respectively.

== Fleet ==
December 1953:

- 4 Douglas DC-4

November 1959:

- 4 Douglas DC-6
- 9 Douglas DC-7

August 1971:

- 5 Douglas DC-8-63CF
- 4 Douglas DC-9-32CF
- 2 Douglas DC-9-33CF
- 9 Lockheed L-188CF Electra

September 1976:

- 4 Douglas DC-8-61CF
- 4 Douglas DC-8-63CF
- 6 Douglas DC-8-20/30
- 4 Douglas DC-9-30CF

== Accidents ==
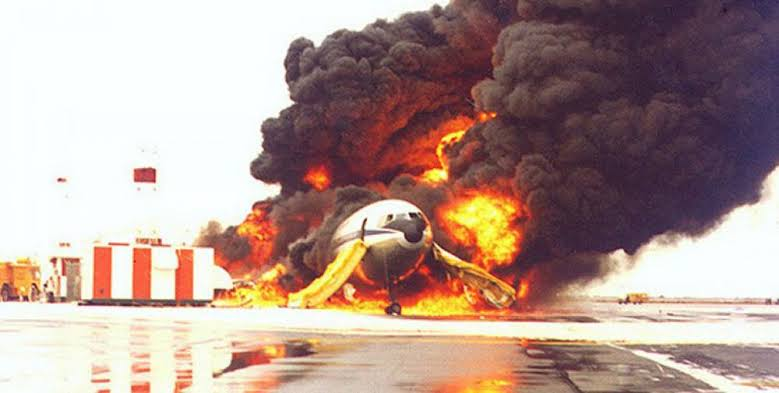
DC-10 on fire at JFK in 1975

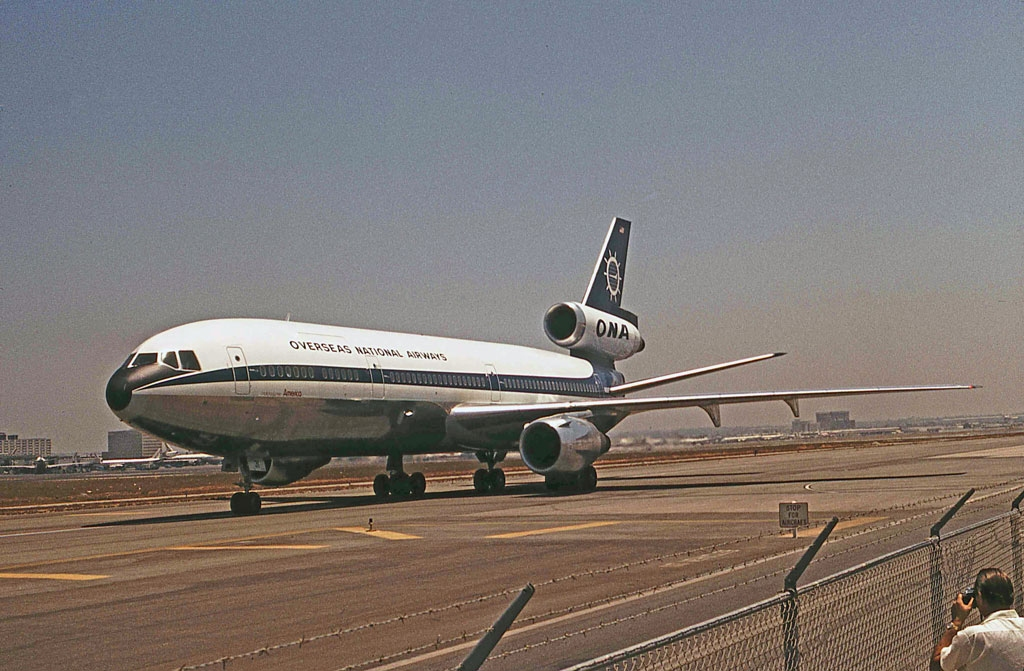
DC-10 that crashed at Istanbul in 1976, seen at Los Angeles in 1973

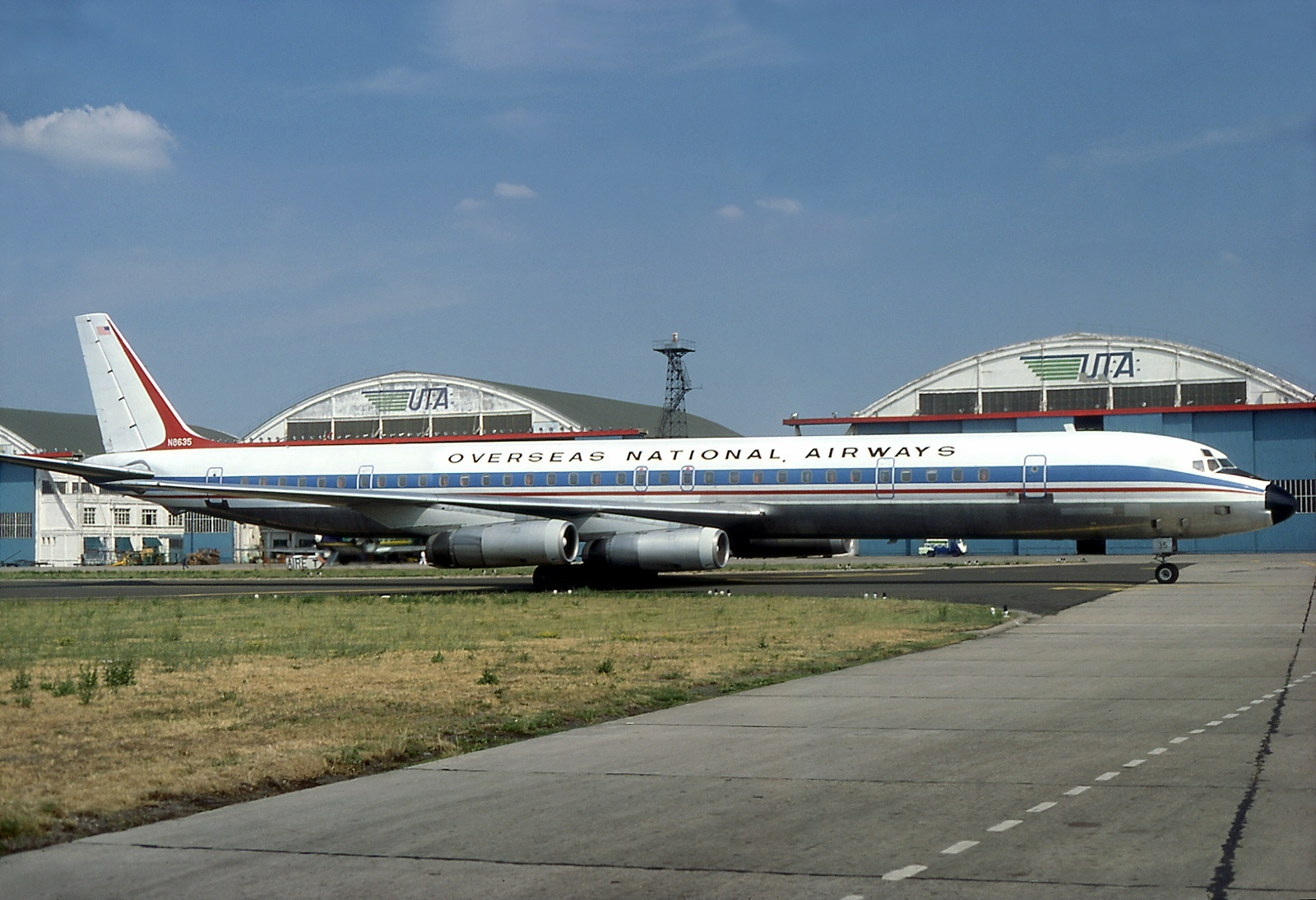
DC-8 that crashed in Niger in 1977 while operating for UTA, the logo of which is on the hangars behind

- November 17, 1951: DC-4 N79992 collided with California Eastern Airways DC-4 N4002B near Oakland Airport while both aircraft were on instrument check flights with hoods installed in the left-hand side of the cockpits. The collision destroyed the ONA DC-4 and killed all three pilots. The California Eastern pilots survived, albeit with aircraft damage. The pilots were cited for failure to keep watch, and California Eastern for lack of a third pilot as required observer.
- June 20, 1961 DC-7 N312A was doing an engine runup under the control of mechanics when the brakes failed and aircraft rolled forward into Lockheed Constellation N5595A, which was being moved by other mechanics. The collision resulted in substantial damage to both aircraft and injuries to the mechanic towing the Connie. The ONA aircraft was a writeoff.
- September 26, 1961 DC-7 N317A suffered a hydraulic failure on a ferry flight from New York to Norfolk Naval Air Station in Norfolk, Virginia. Captain did not properly brief the crew. Landing gear and flaps were deployed without hydraulics but there was loss of directional control on landing. Captain used unapproved means of differential reverse thrust, aircraft went off runway and hit an embankment, shearing off the nose gear and one of the mains, with post-impact fire. Crew of five was unharmed, aircraft was a writeoff.
- May 2, 1970: ALM Flight 980 operated by ONA DC-9-30 N935F named "Carib Queen", originating at New York, failed several times to land at St. Maarten then attempted to divert to St. Croix, ditching 35 miles offshore St. Croix when the aircraft ran out of fuel, killing 23 of 63 on board. See External links for a reference to a 2008 book on this incident.
- November 12, 1975: Flight 032, DC-10 N1032F on a ferry flight to Frankfurt Airport, suffered a bird strike while on its takeoff roll at John F. Kennedy International Airport in New York. The aircraft was destroyed, but all 139 people on board survived.
- January 2, 1976: Saudia Flight 5130, ONA operated DC-10 N1031F, landed short at Istanbul. A fire occurred in the #1 engine after the aircraft crash-landed. The aircraft was destroyed but all passengers and crew survived. See External links for video of the aftermath.
- March 4, 1977: DC-8-63CF registration N8635 operating a cargo flight for French airline UTA, crashed on approach to Niamey Airport in Niger, killing two of the four crew and the write off of the aircraft.

== See also ==
- National Airlines (1983–1985)
- Supplemental air carrier
- List of defunct airlines of the United States
- Logair
- Quicktrans
