= MV Cunard Ambassador =

Cruise ship

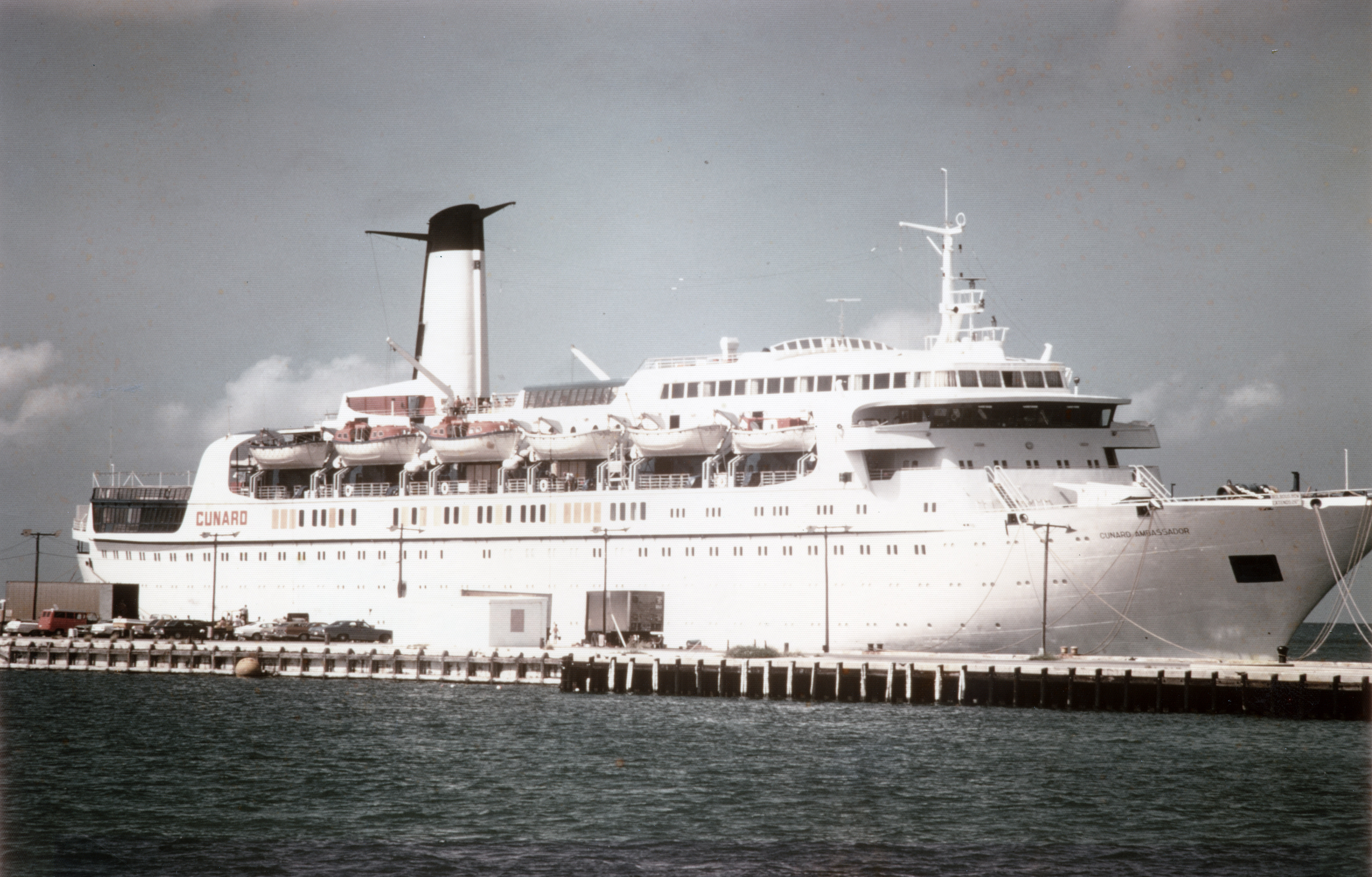
- Cunard Ambassador in Key West after an on-board fire, September 1974

History
- Name: Cunard Ambassador
- Owner: Cunard Line
- Route: New York City to Bermuda; San Juan to other Caribbean ports; Vancouver to Alaska
- Builder: Rotterdamsche Droogdok Maatschappij
- Yard number: 666
- Launched: 16 March 1972
- Completed: October 1972
- Identification: IMO number: 7208144
- Fate: Sold to C. Clausen after an onboard fire 12 September 1974 and converted to a livestock carrier.
- Name: Linda Clausen
- Owner: C. Clausen D/S A/S, København
- Acquired: 1975
- Refit: Converted to a livestock carrier in 1975
- Fate: Sold to Lembu Shipping Corporation of Panama
- Name: Procyon
- Owner: Lembu Shipping Corporation of Panama
- Acquired: 1980
- Fate: Sold to Qatar Transport & Marine Services of Doha
- Name: Raslan
- Owner: Qatar Transport & Marine Services of Doha
- Acquired: 1983
- Fate: Sold for scrap after a fire on 3 July 1983. Arrived in Kaohsiung, Taiwan for scapping on 7 September 1984.

General characteristics
- Type: Cruise ship
- Tonnage: 14,155 GT
- Length: 484 ft (148 m) long
- Beam: 71 ft (22 m)
- Decks: 7
- Installed power: Diesel engines
- Propulsion: Two propellers
- Speed: 20.5 knots (38.0 km/h; 23.6 mph)
- Capacity: 806 all-one-class passengers

MV Cunard Ambassador was a cruise ship planned as one of a class of eight ships for the charter airline Overseas National Airways. At the same time, the Cunard Line was moving into the cruise market because the increasing popularity of international flights meant that its transatlantic passenger services were no longer viable.

== Ship history ==
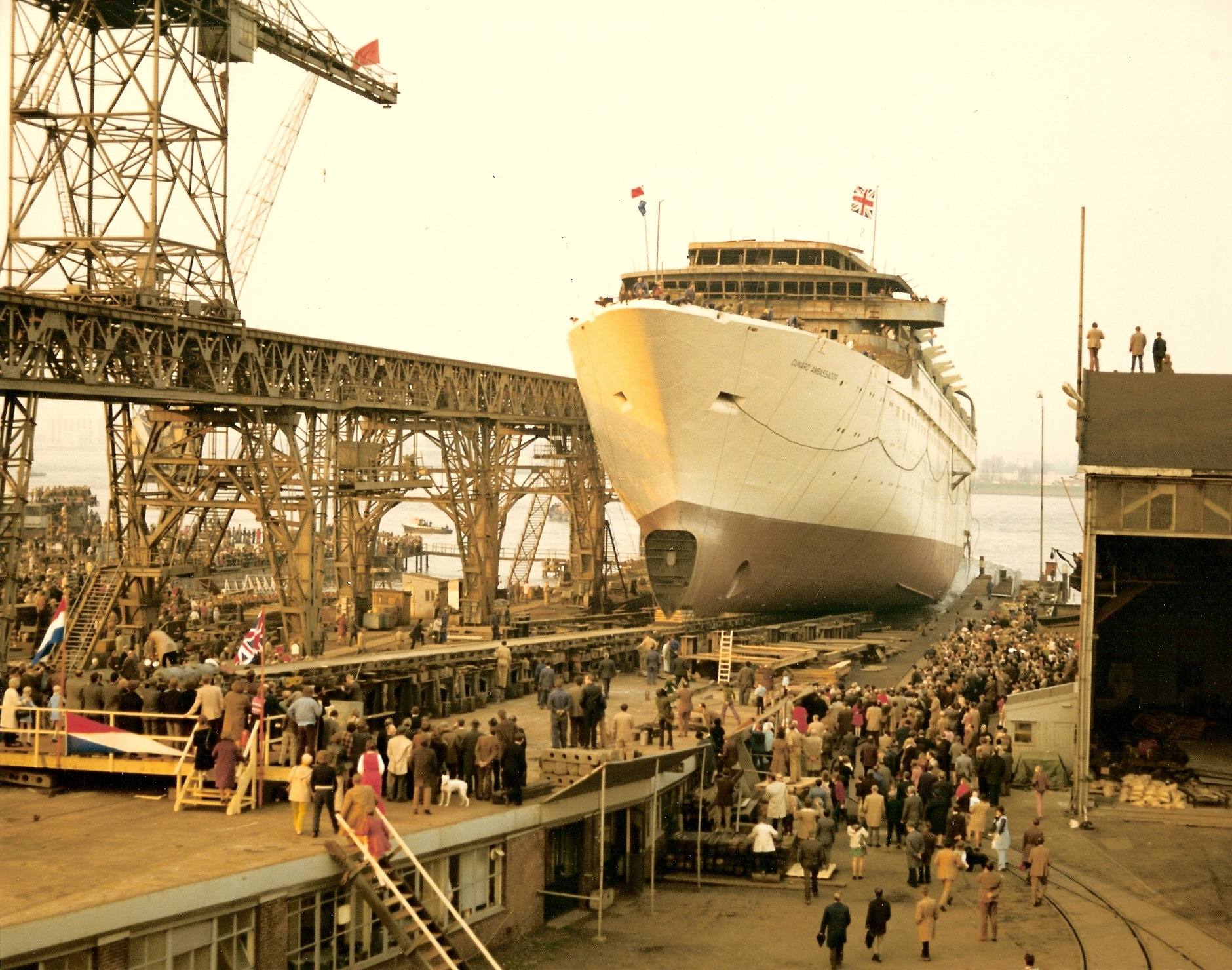
Launch of Cunard Ambassador, March 16, 1972

Because of the cost of the eight-ship project, Overseas National Airways soon ran into financial troubles and was forced to abandon it. Cunard saw the opportunity and quickly took the project on, soon reducing the order to two ships, which it christened Cunard Adventurer (1971) and Cunard Ambassador (1972). Both ships were intended for seven-day cruises, including New York City to Bermuda, San Juan to other Caribbean ports, and Vancouver to Alaska during the summer seasons.

The two ships were less successful than intended. Cunard Adventurer was soon sold and became Sunward II and later Triton; Cunard Ambassador was withdrawn from Cunard service on September 12, 1974, after a fire on a positioning trip. There were no passengers on board and no fatalities but, after being towed to Key West, the ship was declared a total loss.

The hulk was sold as a gutted hull and refitted to become the Danish sheep carrier, Linda Clausen later the same year. In 1980, she was sold again and became Procyon. In April 1981 she again caught fire, whilst bunkering in Singapore; the salvors Smit, SISEA and SELCO successfully fought the fire. The ship was again repaired and, in 1983, renamed Raslan. In 1983, only a year after being rechristened Raslan, she suffered another devastating fire in the Indian Ocean. The ship was deemed was beyond economic repair so after thirteen years of service the hulk was sold to Taiwanese ship breakers and scrapped.

== Influence ==
Shortly after the sale of Cunard Adventurer and the first fire on Cunard Ambassador, Cunard planned two new ships, Cunard Countess and Cunard Conquest, later changed to Cunard Princess. The design incorporated many features of the failed Adventurer and Ambassador including a similar sleek profile and angular funnel and the white-painted hull.
