= National Airlines (1983–1985) =

US charter airline (1982–1985)

National Airlines Overseas National Airways
IATA	ICAO	Call sign
OV	NAN	Nation Air
- Founded: July 1977
- Commenced operations: 1982
- Ceased operations: December 1985
- Operating bases: New York, New York; Jeddah, Saudi Arabia
- Fleet size: See Fleet below
- Headquarters: New York, New York; United States
- Key people: Robert E. Wagenfeld
- Founder: G.F. Steedman Hinckley

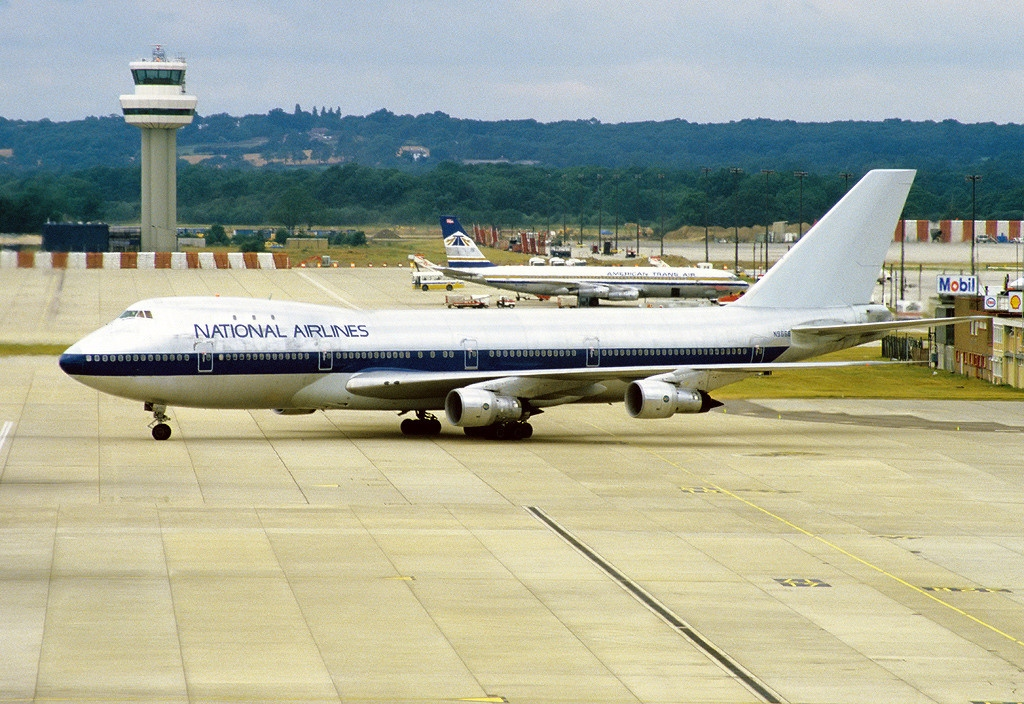
747-100 Gatwick 1984

From 1982 to 1985, a company called United Air Carriers flew as a US airline under the names Overseas National Airways and then National Airlines. This airline was the second user of both names after the original Overseas National Airways and National Airlines. The airline was started by former officers of, but was not a legal successor to, the original Overseas National Airways ("original ONA").

The parent company of United Air Carriers operated commercial aircraft outside the United States starting in 1977. While these were commercial aircraft operations by a US company, they were not performed under a United States airline certificate and were thus not those of a US airline.

The history of this carrier is confused by multiple uses of the same name for different entities. Apart from the original ONA, the airline used the name "Overseas National Airways" at least twice for different entities and also used the name "United Air Carriers" at least twice for different entities.

The combined entities controlled over 30 large commercial aircraft at its height.

== History ==
=== Original Overseas National Airways ===
G.F. Steedman Hinckley led the original ONA out of bankruptcy in 1965 and made it a top supplemental air carrier (charter carrier) of the late 1960s/early 1970s, but was pushed out the company in October 1977 after a period of failed diversification and disappointing financial results. Original ONA ceased operations in September 1978; the company voluntarily liquidated rather than face the risks of a quickly deregulating airline industry.

=== Operations outside the United States ===
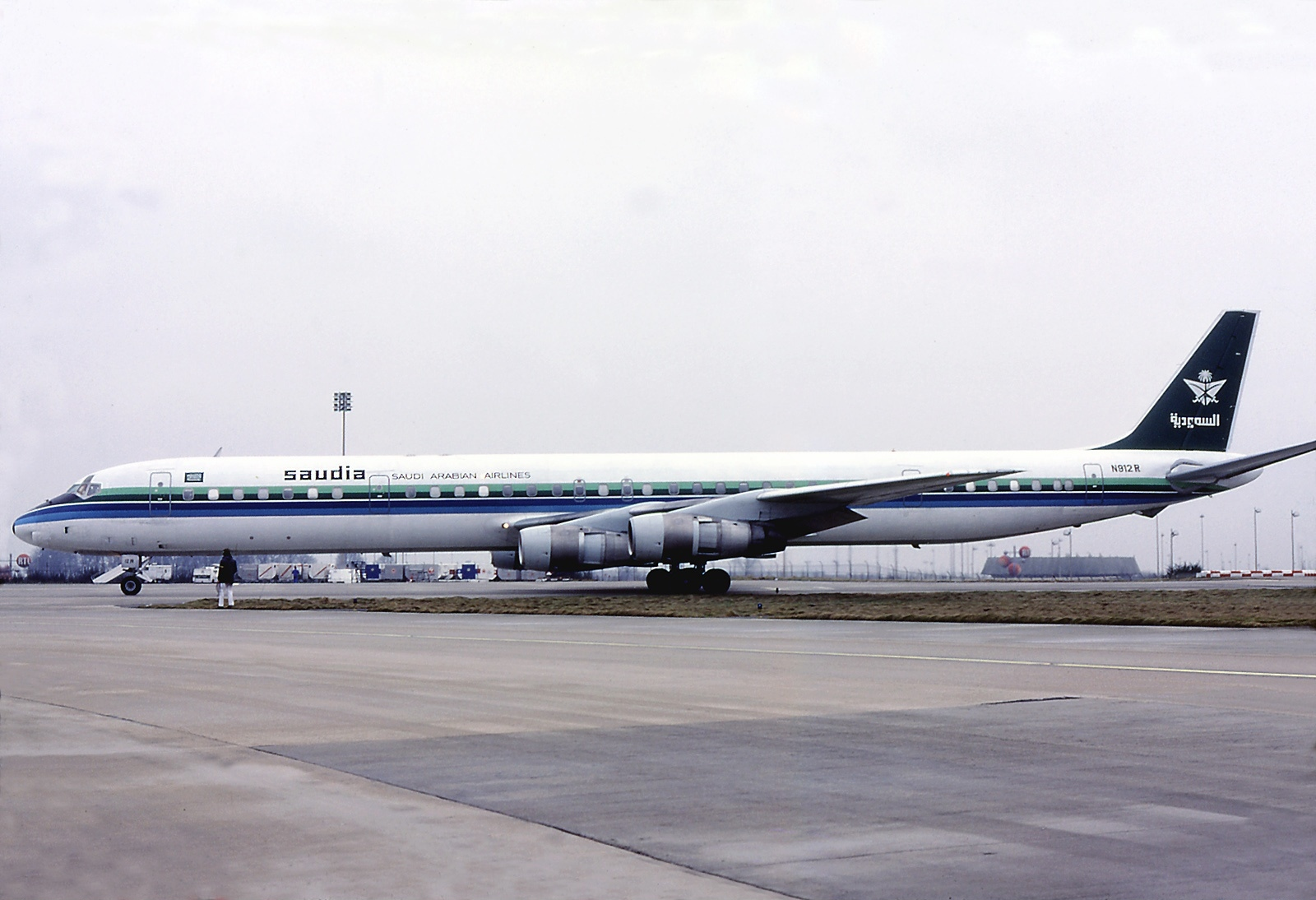
Operating for Saudi Arabian Airlines Paris 1981, pre-US certification

United Air Carriers, Inc. (UAC1) was incorporated in Oklahoma in July 1977 and started operating overseas for airlines like Saudi Arabian Airlines, Garuda and Pakistan International. Its main operational base was Jeddah, Saudi Arabia. UAC1 bought the rights to the name "Overseas National Airways" before the original ONA dissolved, created a Delaware corporation of that name (ONA1) and merged UAC1 into ONA1 in May 1979. International operations continued under the name Overseas National Airways. In October 1979 Hinckley and his family owned 61% of ONA1 and Robert E. Wagenfeld, another former original ONA executive, had bit more than 30%; ONA1 and affiliates had 350 employees. ONA1 did not operate as a US airline; the Civil Aeronautics Board (CAB) noted in April 1980 (when it economically certificated ONA1 as a domestic cargo airline) that ONA1 had never been operationally certificated by the Federal Aviation Administration (FAA). ONA1 did not use its domestic cargo authority.

=== US airline activities ===
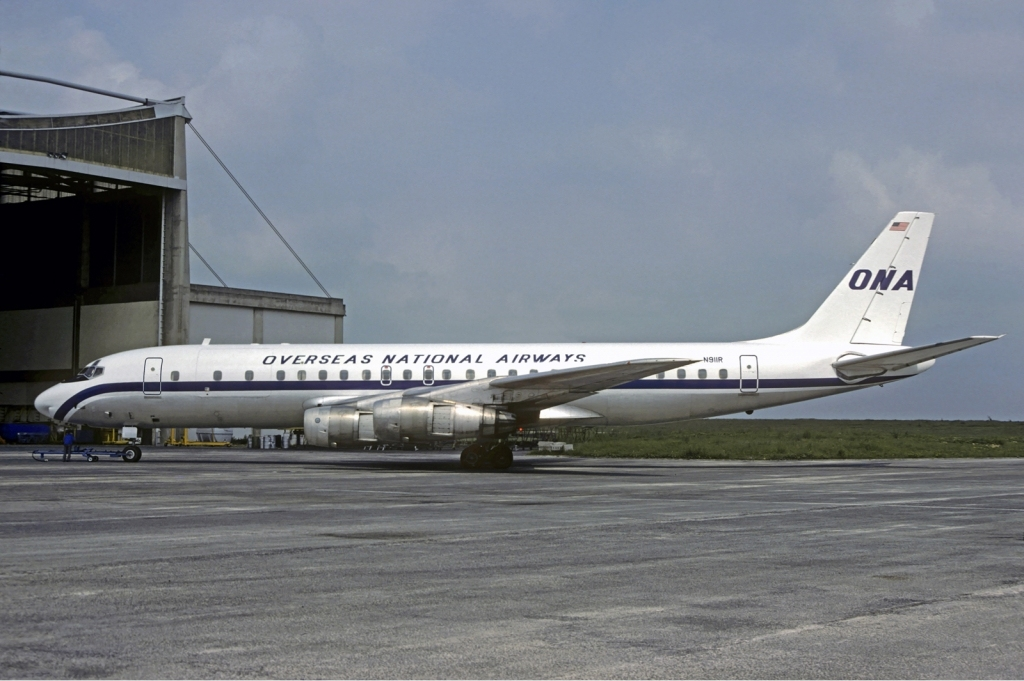
DC-8-55F May 1982

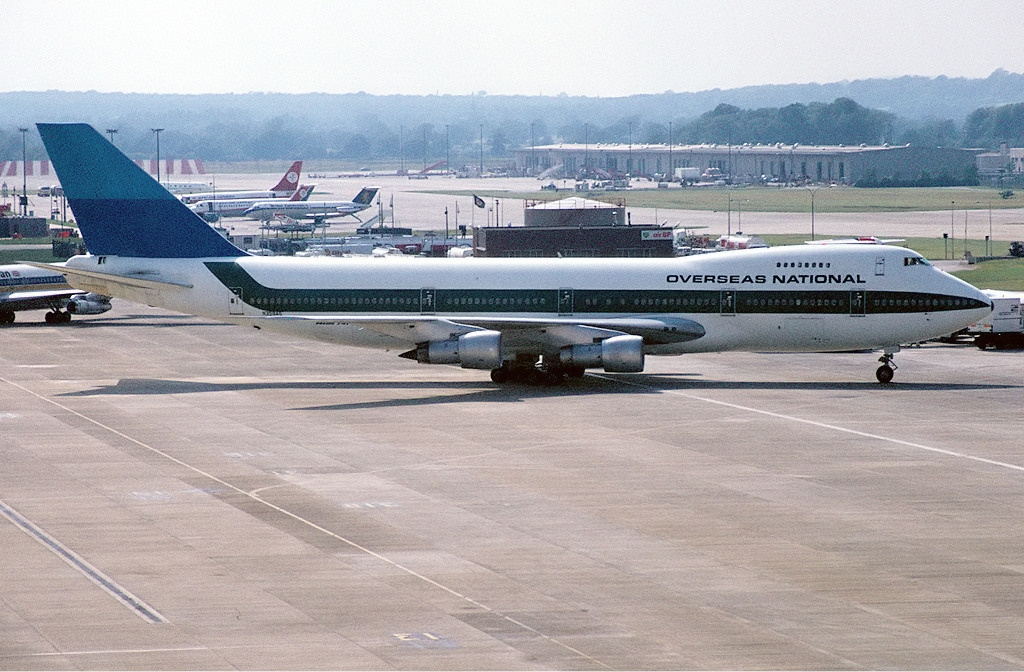
747-200 Gatwick 1983

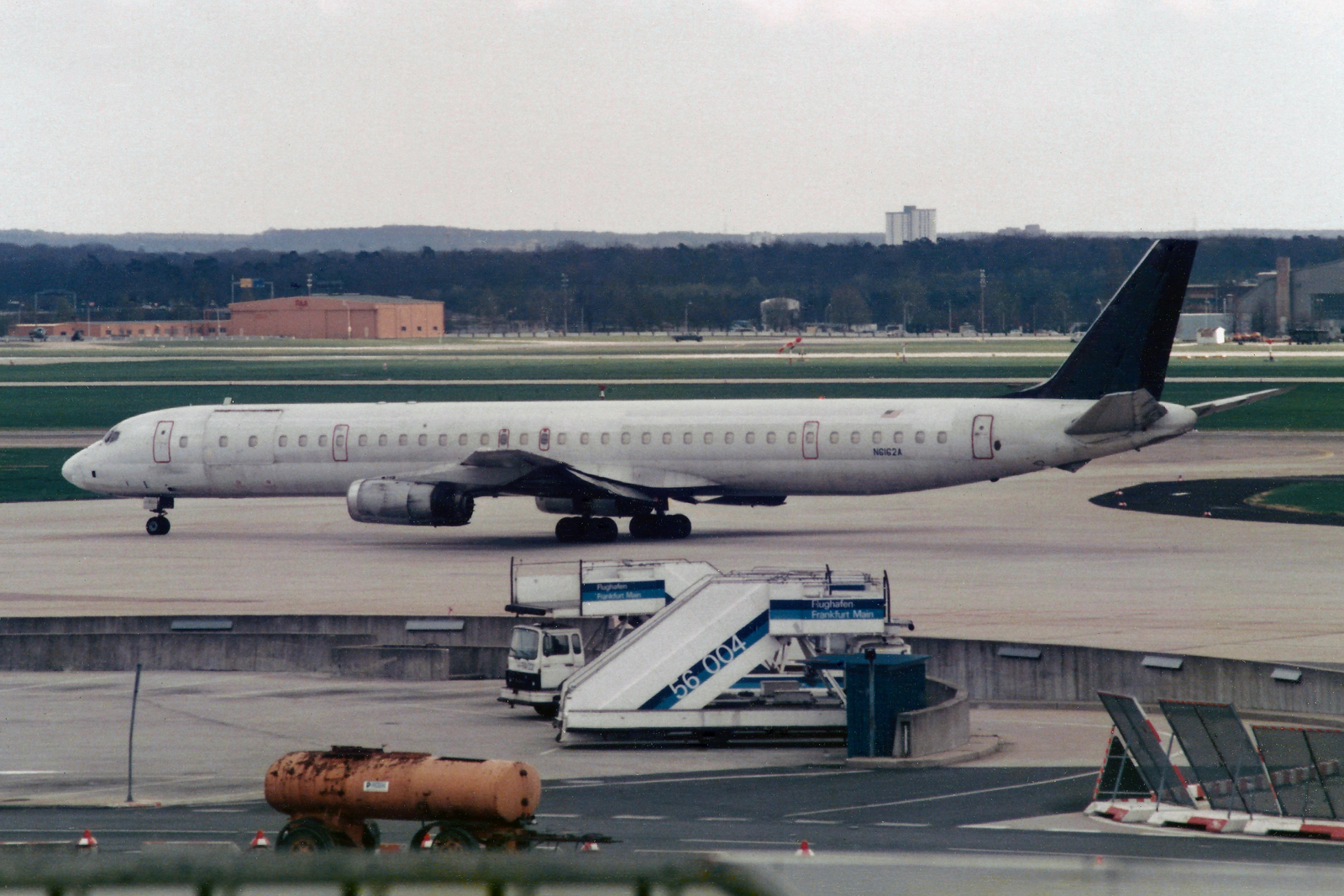
DC-8-63CF Frankfurt 1985

In December 1981, the CAB certificated United Air Carriers (UAC2) (a different entity from UAC1, which dissolved into ONA1) as a charter carrier with authority for passenger and freight both domestic and international. ONA1 owned 100% of UAC2, but UAC2 also did business as "Overseas National Airways". Hence "Overseas National Airways" (ONA1) was both the owner of UAC2, but also its tradename (ONA2). ONA1 (and its predecessor) had been consistently profitable since 1977, with nine-month's revenue to March 1981 of $35.6 million (over $120 million in 2025 terms) and pre-tax profits of $3.5 million, and controlled over 30 large commercial aircraft, including 15 Douglas DC-8s and a Boeing 707. The certificate was effective (including FAA operational authority) in February 1982. The company's headquarters were at John F. Kennedy International Airport in New York. 1982 was the first year "United Air Carriers" or "Overseas National Airways" appears as an airline in the annual FAA Statistical Handbook of Aviation. Neither is present in that publication in 1979, 1980 or 1981. As of January 1983, UAC2 had pilot bases at New York and Jeddah.

In May 1983 the Air Line Pilots Association (ALPA) petitioned the National Mediation Board (NMB) to find UAC2 the successor to original ONA, and thus ALPA entitled to represent UAC2 pilots, but in 1985 the NMB declined to make such an finding.

In 1983, UAC2 changed its dba to National Airlines, purchasing the name from Pan Am in a contract where UAC2 agreed to not use this identity in certain markets for up to five years. The original aim was to use "National Airways," before settling on "National Airlines." The name change was official 1 December 1983 and which time the carrier said it offered charters to Paris, Rome, Rio de Janeiro, London, Zurich and Milan. The carrier claimed a fleet of 38 aircraft. The FAA showed an operating fleet of 11 for year-end 1983, so 38 presumably also reflected leasing activity. By summer 1983, Wagenfeld was also majority owner and CEO.

In late 1983, UAC2 agreed to operate two newly-ordered Alisarda MD-82 aircraft (for delivery in 1984) during the winter season. And records show National operated an MD-82 the winter of 1984–1985.

As well as civilian charters, UAC2 operated charters for Military Airlift Command (MAC). Relative to such charters, a 1986 Congressional report noted that based on data from industry-wide FAA inspections, UAC2 had one of the highest levels of "severity level 3" FAA inspection comments, "representing situations having the highest potential for unsafe flight conditions."

The airline faced financial problems and by December 1985 it ceased operations, filing for bankruptcy in May 1986.

== Fleet ==
Non-US operations October 1979:

- 2 Boeing 747
- 15 Douglas DC-8

Total aircraft in operation at year end for US-certificated United Air Carriers:

- 1982: 10
- 1983: 11
- 1984: 25

Other aircraft types known to be flown by the combined entities:

- Boeing 707
- McDonnell Douglas MD-82

== Incidents ==
- January 15, 1981: Overseas National Airways DC-8-61 registration N913R was undergoing maintenance in a Cargolux hangar at Luxembourg Airport in the early morning hours when a fire broke out in an unattended portion of the aircraft, ultimately destroying the jet.

== See also ==
- Overseas National Airways
- List of defunct airlines of the United States
