= MV Cunard Adventurer =

Cruise ship

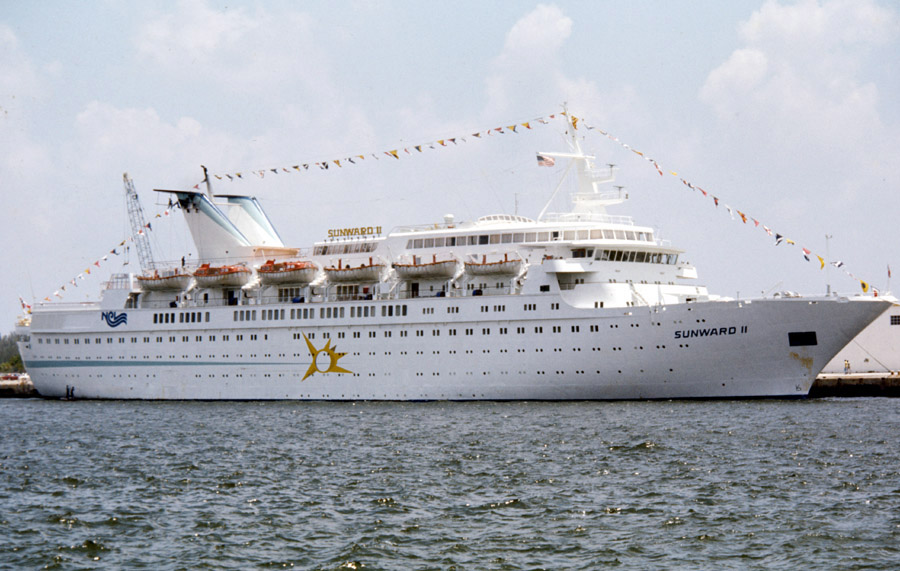
- MS Sunward II moored in PortMiami in December 1980

History
- Name: Cunard Adventurer (1971–1977); Sunward II (1977–1991); Triton (1991–2004); Coral (2004–2013); Cora (2013–2014)
- Operator: Cunard (1971–1977); Norwegian Cruise Line (1977–1991); Epirotiki Line (1991–1995); Royal Olympic Cruises (1995–2004); Louis Cruises (2004–2013)
- Port of registry: Limassol (until 2013 or 2014)
- Builder: De Rotterdamsche Droogdok, Rotterdam, Netherlands
- Launched: 2 February 1971
- Completed: 1971
- Maiden voyage: 1971
- In service: 1971
- Out of service: 2013
- Identification: IMO number: 7046936
- Fate: Scrapped at Alang, India in 2014

General characteristics
- Tonnage: 14,194 GT
- Length: 148 m (485 ft 7 in)
- Beam: 22 m (72 ft 2 in)
- Draught: 6.15 m (20 ft 2 in)
- Decks: 7 (passenger decks)
- Propulsion: Four 12-cylinder Stork-Werkspoor diesel engines
- Speed: 21.5 knots (39.8 km/h; 24.7 mph)
- Capacity: 718/832, 756/945

MV Cunard Adventurer (also known as Sunward II Adventurer, Triton and Coral ) was a cruise ship built for Cunard and operated from 1971 to 1977. She was the first of the company's vessels in the 20th century to bear a name that did not end in "ia" or begin with "Queen".

== Design and construction ==
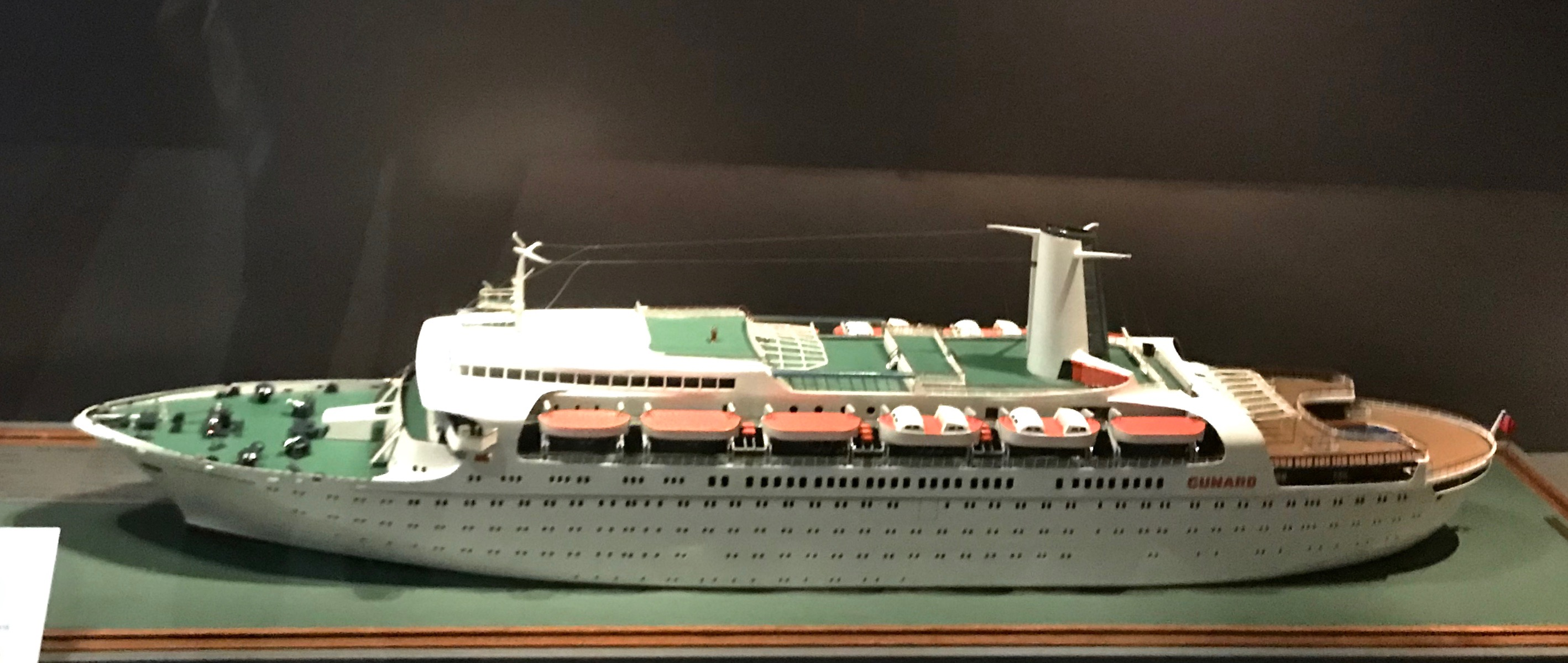
Model of Cunard Adventurer at SeaCity Museum in Southampton, England showing original design and livery

The ship was originally intended for as a series of eight identical ships were especially designed for Overseas National Airways. However, due to financial difficulties the order was reduced to two ships, and Cunard, who had ownership in the Airline took over the orders to complete the two ships. The Cunard Adventurer would be Cunard's attempt to join the modern cruise industry of the 1970s. The exterior was designed by British designer James Gardner, who had also done the exterior design of the Queen Elizabeth 2. The Adventurer was designed to accommodate 832 passengers in a one class configuration with a crew of 412 and she operated at a cruising speed of 22 knots. The ship was built at the Rotterdamsche Droogdok Maatschappij N.V. of Rotterdam. The ship was launched on February 2, 1971, and entered service in November 1971, for followed by her sister ship Cunard Ambassador in 1972.

== Service history ==
The Cunard Adventurer's maiden voyage was from Southampton to San Juan, Puerto Rico, where she would operate one week fly cruises around the Caribbean and South America. During other seasons the ship would operate out of Norfolk, Virginia to Bermuda. The ship had a relatively incident free service under Cunard, except for colliding with Costa Lines Carla C in February 1975 in San Juan where the bow was damaged. The ship would receive the traditional Cunard livery in the final years under Cunard, where she operated cruises to Alaska. Cunard found the ships to be too small, and would sell both, replacing them with the larger Cunard Princess and Cunard Countess.

Sold in 1977, Cunard Adventurer became Sunward II for Norwegian Cruise Line. During her refit, her Queen Elizabeth 2-style funnel was removed and replaced by a NCL-style funnel along with the Gardner designed curves bulkheads and bow.

In 1991 the ship was sold to Epirotiki Lines, and operated around the Greek Isles, In 1995 Epirotoki Lines formed a new cruise company called Royal Olympic Cruise Lines where the ship would join this new cruise company that Epirotoki Lines would create together with another cruise company. In 1998 Premier Cruises was interested in buying the ship but Premier Cruises in the end did not manage to buy it and in the end the advertising that Premier Cruises had already made where the ship appeared was useless because it never entered operations with Premier Cruises.

In April 2005 she was sold at auction to Louis Cruises. As Coral she sailed in the Mediterranean Sea and Greek islands until 2011. Louis announced in May 2013 that for the 2014 season, Coral was to be renamed Louis Rhea, to reflect the company's Hellenic heritage. However, in December the plans were cancelled and she was reported to have been sold to a scrap firm in Aliağa, Turkey and subsequently to Alang, India. She arrived in Alang for breaking on 30 January 2014.
