= List of ship launches in 2006 =

The list of ship launches in 2006 includes a chronological list of ships launched in 2006.

Date	Ship	Class / type	Builder	Location	Country	Notes
20 January	COSCO Ningbo	container ship	Hyundai Heavy Industries	Usan	South Korea	For COSCO sister ship of COSCO Guangzhou
27 January	Palatia	Type Hyundai 2530 TEU container ship	STX Offshore & Shipbuilding	Jinhae	South Korea	
1 February	Daring	Type 45 destroyer	BAE Systems Naval Ships (YSL)	Scotstoun, Glasgow, Scotland	United Kingdom	
1 February	Analena	Sietas type 178 container ship	Schiffswerft J.J. Sietas	Hamburg-Neuenfelde	Germany	For Peter Döhle Schiffahrts KG
19 February	Pride of Hawaii	Jewel-class cruise ship	Meyer Werft	Papenburg	Germany	For Norwegian Cruise Line
20 February	Hanseatic Explorer		Fassmer	Berne	Germany	For Harren & Partner
23 February	Georg Mærsk	Mærsk D-class container ship	Odense Staalskibsvaerft	Lindø	Denmark	For Maersk Line
7 March	Torm Skagen	type Oshima 76D bulk carrier	Oshima Shipbuilding Company	Saikai	Japan	For ND Shipping; IMO 9287182
10 March	COSCO Yanitan	container ship	Hyundai Heavy Industries	Usan	South Korea	For COSCO sister ship of COSCO Guangzhou
18 March	SAS Queen Modjadji	Type 209 submarine	Howaldtswerke-Deutsche Werft	Kiel	Germany	For South African Navy
29 March	MOL Sunrise	Type Hyundai 2530 TEU container ship	STX Offshore & Shipbuilding	Jinhae	South Korea	
30 March	Kolkata	Kolkata-class destroyer	Mazagon Dock Limited	Mumbai	India	
8 April	Ariana	Type Stocznia Gdynia 8184-container ship	Stocznia Gdynia	Gdynia	Poland	
14 April	COSCO Beijing	container ship	Hyundai Heavy Industries	Usan	South Korea	For COSCO sister ship of COSCO Guangzhou
18 April	Anina	Sietas type 178 container ship	Schiffswerft J.J. Sietas	Hamburg-Neuenfelde	Germany	For Peter Döhle Schiffahrts KG
19 April	Braunschweig	Braunschweig-class corvette	Blohm + Voss	Hamburg	Germany	
28 April	Otto Sverdrup	Fridtjof Nansen-class frigate	Navantia	Ferrol	Spain	For Royal Norwegian Navy
9 May	Supreme	Formidable-class frigate	ST Engineering	Benoi	Singapore	
11 May	Rita	Sietas type 178 container ship	Schiffswerft J.J. Sietas	Hamburg-Neuenfelde	Germany	For Peter Döhle Schiffahrts KG
13 May	Johan de Witt	Rotterdam-class amphibious transport dock	Koninklijke Schelde Groep	Flushing	Netherlands	
19 May	COSCO Hellas	container ship	Hyundai Heavy Industries	Usan	South Korea	For COSCO sister ship of COSCO Guangzhou
20 May	OOCL Europe	OOCL SX-class container ship	Geoje	Samsung Heavy Industries	South Korea	For Orient Overseas Container Line
27 May	Maersk Norwich	Type Hyundai 2530 TEU container ship	STX Offshore & Shipbuilding	Jinhae	South Korea	
29 May	Maersk Needham	Type Hyundai 2530 TEU container ship	STX Offshore & Shipbuilding	Jinhae	South Korea	IMO 9301938
1 June	Emerald Princess	Grand-class cruise ship	Fincantieri	Monfalcone	Italy	For Princess Cruises
9 June	Son Won-il	Type 214 submarine	Hyundai Heavy Industries		South Korea	For South Korean Navy
9 June	Euphoria	Sietas type 168 container ship	Schiffswerft J.J. Sietas	Hamburg-Neuenfelde	Germany	For
14 June	Clyde	River-class offshore patrol vessel	VT Group	HMNB Portsmouth, Portsmouth, England	United Kingdom	
17 June	Hawaii	Virginia-class submarine	Electric Boat	Groton, Connecticut	United States	
23 June	Bomar Spring	Type Stocznia Gdynia 8184-container ship	Stocznia Gdynia	Gdynia	Poland	
24 June	Sacagawea	Lewis and Clark-class dry cargo ship	National Steel & Shipbuilding	San Diego, California	United States	
30 June	Seacoud		Lindenau	Kiel	Germany	For German Tanker Shipping
4 July	Eucon Leader	Damen Container Feeder 800 container ship	Santierul Naval Damen Galati SA	Galați	Romania	
12 July	Chevalier Paul	Horizon-class frigate	DCN	Lorient	France	
16 July	Hermann Wulff	Type Stocznia Gdynia 8184-container ship	Stocznia Gdynia	Gdynia	Poland	
4 August	Costa Serena	Concordia-class cruise ship	Fincantieri	Sestri Ponente	Italy	For Costa Cruises
10 August	Hamza	Agosta 90B-class submarine	Karachi Shipyard	Karachi	Pakistan	
11 August	Green Bay	San Antonio-class amphibious transport dock	Northrop Grumman Ship Systems	Avondale, Louisiana	United States	
30 August	Ashigara	Atago-class destroyer	Mitsubishi Heavy Industries	Nagasaki	Japan	
6 September	Magdeburg	Braunschweig-class corvette	Lürssen	Bremen-Vegesack	Germany	
12 September	Argyle	Ferry	Remontowa Group	Gdańsk	Poland	For Caledonian MacBrayne
16 September	Sampson	Arleigh Burke-class destroyer	Bath Iron Works	Bath, Maine	United States	
19 September	Jork Reliance	Damen Container Feeder 800 container ship	Santierul Naval Damen Galati SA	Galați	Romania	
22 September	Makin Island	Wasp-class amphibious assault ship	Ingalls Shipbuilding	Pascagoula, Mississippi	United States	
23 September	Freedom	Freedom-class littoral combat ship	Marinette Marine	Marinette, Wisconsin	United States	
29 September	Bertholf	Legend-class cutter	NGSS Ingalls	Pascagoula, Mississippi	United States	
5 October	RMS Kiel	Futura Carrier-type coastal trading vessel	ConMar	Brake	Germany	IMO 9352846
9 October	George H.W. Bush	Nimitz-class aircraft carrier	Northrop Grumman	Newport News, Virginia	United States	
15 October	Norwegian Pearl	Jewel-class cruise ship	Meyer Werft	Papenburg	Germany	For Norwegian Cruise Line
20 October	Westerdiek	Type Stocznia Gdynia 8184-container ship	Stocznia Gdynia	Gdynia	Poland	
25 October	OOCL Tokyo	OOCL SX-class container ship	Geoje	Samsung Heavy Industries	South Korea	For Orient Overseas Container Line
31 October	JPO Sagittarius	Hyundai 2530 TEU type container ship	STX Offshore & Shipbuilding	Jinhae	South Korea	
6 November	Mochishio	Oyashio-class submarine			Japan	
11 November	Fram	Cruise ship	Fincantieri	Monfalcone	Italy	For Hurtigruten
18 November	Otago	Protector-class offshore patrol vessel	Tenix	Williamstown, Victoria	Australia	For Royal New Zealand Navy
23 November	Star	Cruiseferry	Aker Finnyards Helsinki Shipyard	Helsinki	Finland	For Tallink
26 November	JPO Scorpius	Hyundai 2530 TEU type container ship	STX Offshore & Shipbuilding	Jinhae	South Korea	
November	Pipinos	Type 214 submarine	Hellenic Shipyards	Chaidari	Greece	For Greece Navy
6 December	Alan Shepard	Lewis and Clark-class dry cargo ship	National Steel & Shipbuilding	San Diego, California	United States	
8 December	Osaka Express	Colombo-Express-class container ship	Hyundai Heavy Industries	Ulsan	South Korea	For Hapag Lloyd
15 December	Color Magic	Cruiseferry	Aker Finnyards Turku Shipyard	Turku	Finland	For Color Line; largest cruiseferry in the world when delivered; completed at Aker Finnyards' Rauma shipyard
15 December	Bahia	Bahia-class container ship	Daewoo Shipbuilding & Marine Engineering	Okpo	South Korea	For Hamburg Süd
15 December	Bahia Blanca	Bahia-class container ship	Daewoo Shipbuilding & Marine Engineering	Okpo	South Korea	For Hamburg Süd
15 December	Henneke Rambow	Sietas type 178 container ship	Schiffswerft J.J. Sietas	Hamburg-Neuenfelde	Germany	For Reederei Rambow
29 December	NYK Venus	Container ship	Hyundai Heavy Industries	Ulsan	South Korea	For NYK Line
Unknown date	Bornholm Express	Fast Passenger Ferry	Damen Group	Singapore	Singapore	For Christansøfarten, Gudhjem, Denmark.
Unknown date	Clipper Point	Roll-on/roll-off Ferry	Astilleros de Huelva	Huelva	Spain	For Seatruck Ferries "Heysham Max" vessel for Heysham Warrenpoint route.
Unknown date	MV Finnland	Container ship			United Kingdom	For Navalis GmbH & Co. KG.
Unknown date	Gaselys	LNG carrier	Chantiers de l'Atlantique		France	For Gaz de France.
