= Norwegian Pearl =

Ship in the Norwegian Cruise Line

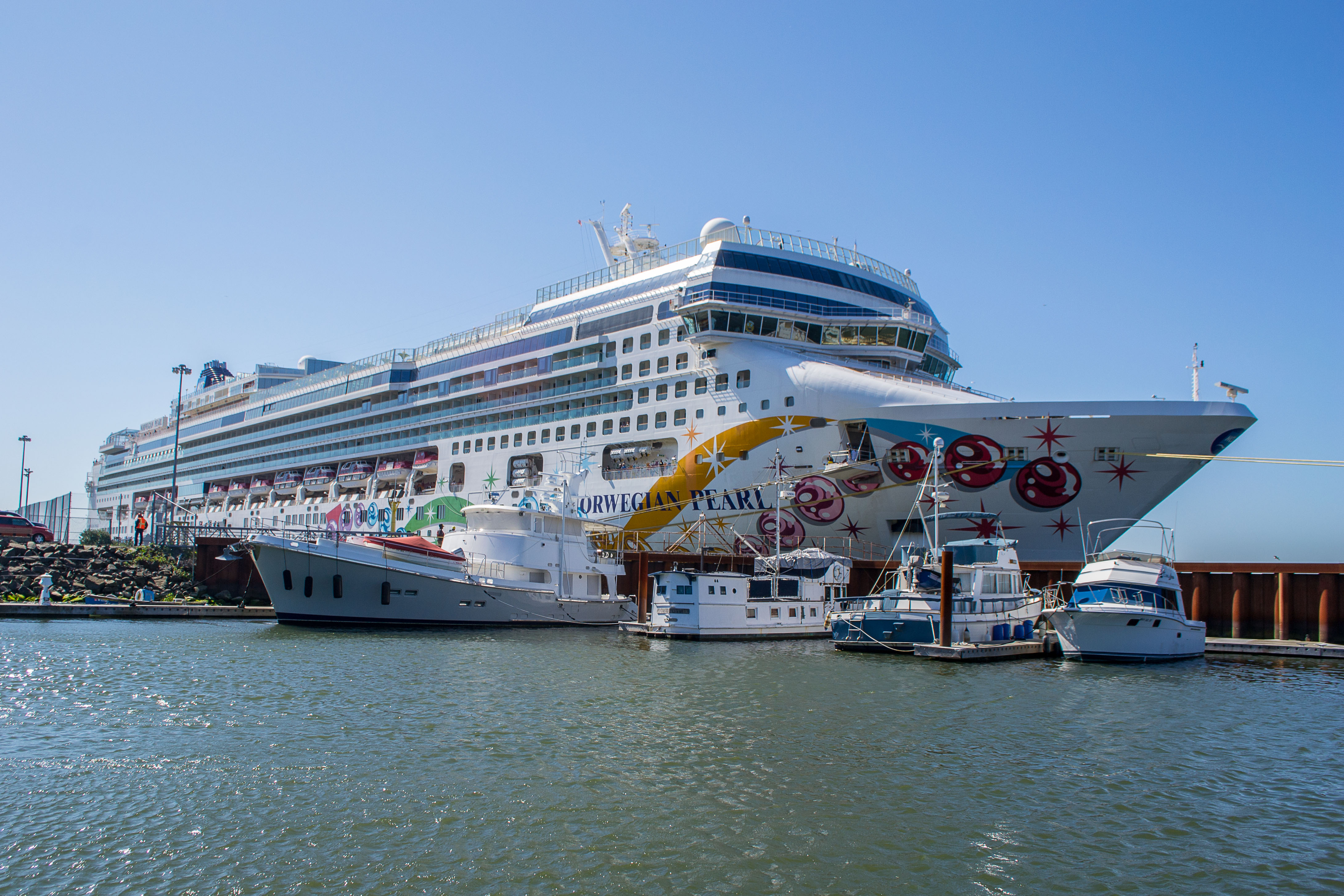
- Norwegian Pearl in Astoria, Oregon, 2013

History

Bahamas
- Name: Norwegian Pearl
- Owner: Norwegian Cruise Line Holdings
- Operator: Norwegian Cruise Line
- Port of registry: Nassau, Bahamas
- Ordered: 24 December 2004
- Builder: Meyer Werft; Papenburg, Germany
- Yard number: 669
- Laid down: 4 October 2005
- Launched: 15 October 2006
- Sponsored by: Rosie O'Donnell
- Christened: 16 December 2006
- Completed: 28 November 2006
- In service: 30 November 2006–present
- Identification: Call sign: C6VG7; IMO number: 9342281; MMSI number: 309653000; DNV ID: 26307
- Status: In service

General characteristics
- Class & type: Jewel-class cruise ship
- Tonnage: 93,530 GT
- Length: 965 ft (294.13 m)
- Beam: 106 ft (32.31 m)
- Height: 59.5 m (195.2 ft)
- Draft: 27 ft (8.23 m)
- Decks: 15
- Installed power: 5 × MAN 12V48/60B
- Propulsion: Two ABB Azipod azimuth thrusters; 3 × Brunvoll bow thrusters
- Speed: 25 knots (46 km/h; 29 mph)
- Capacity: 2,394 passengers
- Crew: 1,099

Norwegian Pearl is a Jewel-class cruise ship of Norwegian Cruise Line (NCL), launched in 2006, sailing itineraries primarily around Alaska and the Caribbean.

== Vessel class ==
Norwegian Pearl is the third of NCL's four Jewel-class ships. She is a training ship for new or returning crew members. She was preceded by Norwegian Jewel in 2005, and Pride of Hawaii (now Norwegian Jade) in 2006. She was followed by Norwegian Gem in 2007. Each ship has different amenities, but has a similar exterior and interior design.

Norwegian Pearl has a similar exterior appearance to NCL's Dawn-class ships; Norwegian Star, which entered service in 2001, and Norwegian Dawn, which entered service in 2002. The interior design and amenities, however, are significantly different and merit Norwegian Pearl a Jewel-class designation.

== History ==
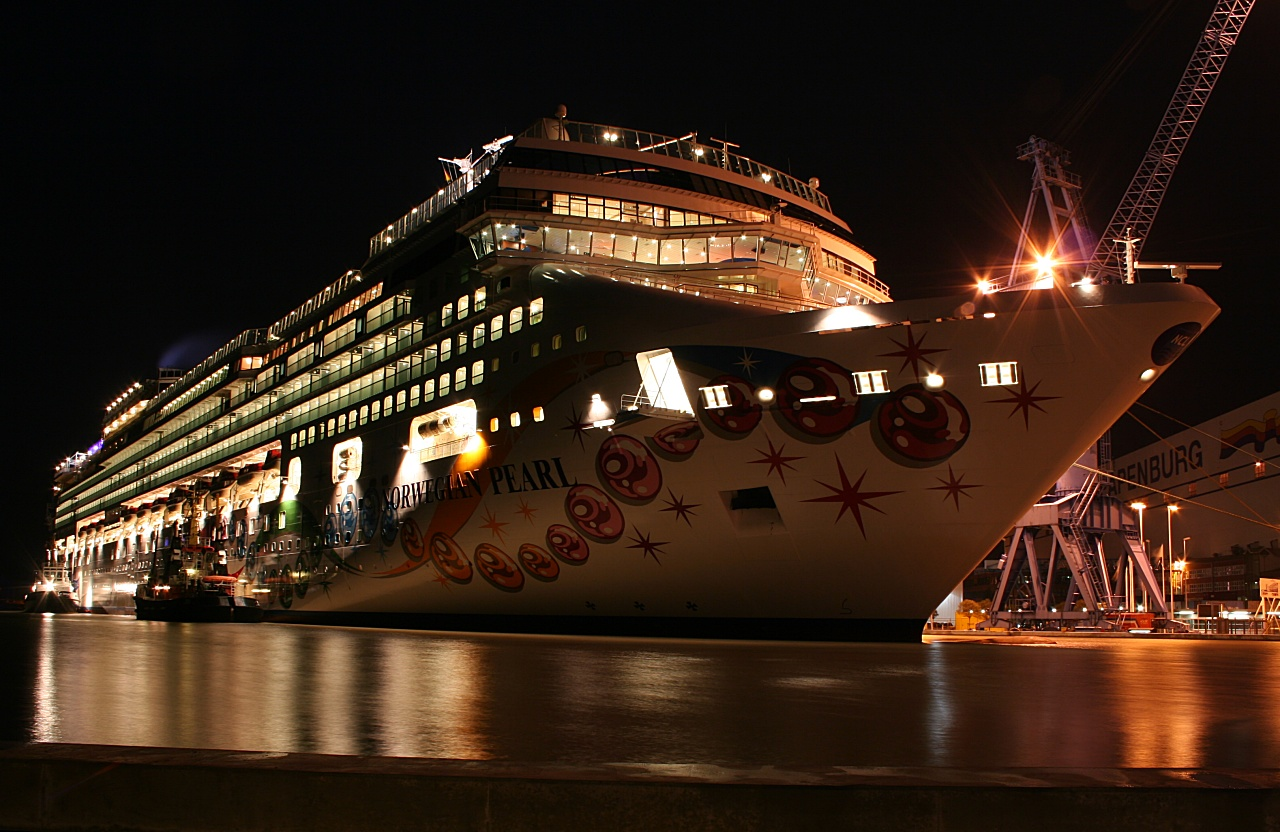
Norwegian Pearl during her final stages of construction in Papenburg, Germany on 5 November 2006

The ship's construction began on 3 October 2005, and she was floated out of the Meyer Werft Shipyard covered building dock on 15 October 2006.

The first attempt of the ship's passage under a power line on the Ems River in Germany is claimed to have been the source for the massive power outage that affected first Germany and then all of Europe on late November 4, 2006.

The ship arrived in Southampton, England on 30 November and left on her first voyage with paying passengers on 2 December, travelling to Miami, Florida, where she was based for her first season. She was christened by Rosie O'Donnell in Miami's Port of Miami on 16 December 2006.

== Special interest cruises ==
In February 2008, Norwegian Pearl became home for the Cayamo "A Journey Through Song" 7-day cruise featuring Americana and bluegrass artists from around the world. As many as 42 musical groups provide passengers with special on-board experiences, activities, guest jams, unique collaborations, and multiple performances from each artist. Past artists include Emmy Lou Harris, John Prine, Lyle Lovett, Earl Klugh, John Hiatt, Buddy Miller and Kris Kristofferson.

Norwegian Pearl was featured on the 2009 CNBC documentary Cruise Inc.: Big Money on the High Seas.

Norwegian Pearl has been used by the rock group Kiss for their annual Kiss Kruise since 2012.

In March 2014, American rock band Paramore embarked on a special three-day event entitled "Parahoy!". The event saw fans embark on a cruise with the band members and featured activities and two concerts.

In February 2015, the ship hosted the annual "Shiprocked" cruise headlining Limp Bizkit, Black Label Society, Buckcherry, and a pre-party headlined by Chevelle. Many other artists and events took place during the cruise both on the ship and on the private island of Great Stirrup Cay.

In January 2016, Norwegian Pearl took to the Caribbean with a ship full of Walker Stalkers, fans of Robert Kirkman's/Skybound Comic's "The Walking Dead". With Sixthman Ninjas leading the way, the first ever "Walker Stalker Cruise" made its maiden voyage from Miami to the island of Freeport Bahamas with celebrity guests from AMC's, The Walking Dead. A second Walker Stalker Cruise took place in February 2017 which called at NCL's private island, Great Stirrup Cay and featured Norman Reedus, Jeffrey Dean Morgan, Greg Nicotero, Tom Payne, Michael Cudlitz, Chandler Riggs, Katelyn Nacon, Michael Traynor, Alana Masterson and Ross Marquand.

The entire Impractical Jokers episode "Cruisin' for a Bruisin'" including all of the challenges and a double punishment of Murr and Joe were filmed on board Norwegian Pearl . The episode aired on May 7, 2015. The cruise ship was then used as the Impractical Jokers Cruise from 2017 to 2020.

The ship was chartered for a Star Trek-themed cruise in January 2017. The six-night cruise had port calls in Mexico and the Bahamas. Two further chartered Star Trek voyages were planned in January 2018.

In February 2019, American singer, Kesha took the ship for a four-day cruise called, Kesha's Weird and Wonderful Rainbow Ride. The cruise started in Tampa, Florida and ended in Nassau, Bahamas.

In January 2020, the ship held Chris Jericho's Rock 'N' Wrestling Rager at Sea, a 4-day professional wrestling and rock music-themed cruise hosted by Chris Jericho. In partnership with All Elite Wrestling (AEW), the January 22 episode of AEW Dynamite was taped aboard the ship on 21 January while it was docked in Nassau, Bahamas.

In February 2020, she hosted the Outlaw Country Cruise 5, sailing from Key West to Falmouth, Jamaica, with multiple country music artists aboard.

In October and November 2023, the ship hosted the Headbangers Boat cruise featuring the metal bands Lamb of God, Mastodon, Gwar, Hatebreed, and Shadows Fall, among others. On November 3, a 41-year-old man attending the Headbangers Boat cruise fell overboard while the ship was sailing near the Bahamas en route to Miami. The music programming was suspended that morning for a search, which lasted for nine hours before it was called off.

In April 2024, the ship hosted the "Summer of '99" cruise, featuring performances by rock bands Creed, 3 Doors Down, Vertical Horizon, Tonic, Buckcherry, Dishwalla, Fuel, Tantric, The Verve Pipe, Louise Post of Veruca Salt, and Nine Days.

In February 2026, the ship hosted the "Ice Cream Floats" cruise, presented by Modest Mouse, featuring performances by rock bands Portugal. The Man, Kurt Vile and the Violators, Mannequin Pussy, Built to Spill, Tropical Fuck Storm, Califone, Ugly Casanova, The Black Heart Procession, and Mattress, as well as comedian David Cross.
