= Norwegian Jade =

Cruise ship

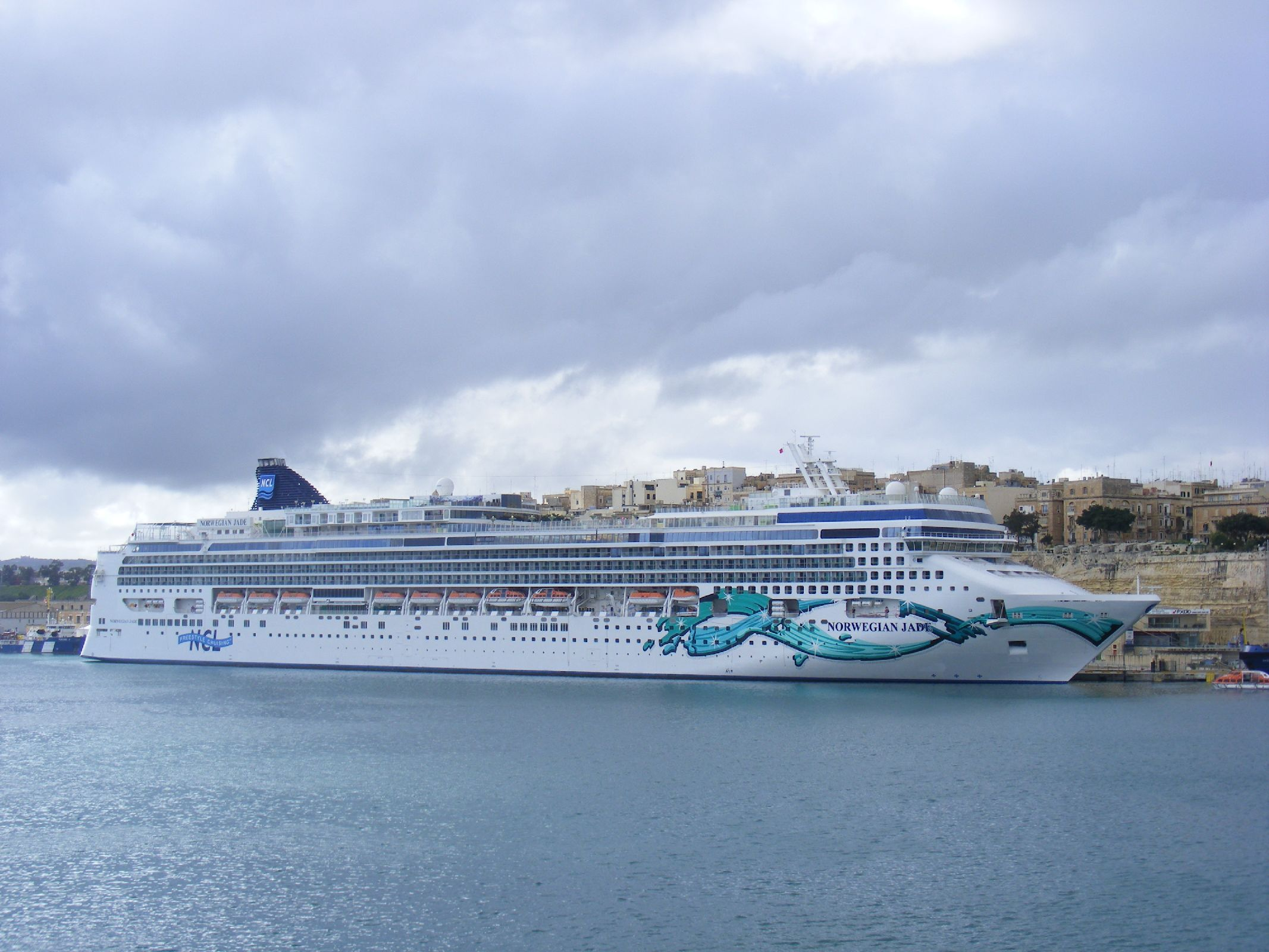
- Norwegian Jade is docked at Valletta in Malta on February 23, 2011

History
- Name: Pride of Hawaii (2006–2008); Norwegian Jade (2008–present)
- Owner: Norwegian Cruise Line Holdings
- Operator: NCL America (2006–2008); Norwegian Cruise Line (2008–present)
- Port of registry: Honolulu, United States (2006–2008); Nassau, Bahamas (2008–present)
- Builder: Meyer Werft, Papenburg, Germany
- Laid down: 6 February 2005
- Launched: 19 February 2006
- Identification: Call sign: C6WK7; IMO number: 9304057; MMSI number: 308416000
- Status: In Service

General characteristics
- Class & type: Jewel-class cruise ship
- Tonnage: 93,558 GT
- Length: 965 ft (294 m)
- Beam: 125 ft (38 m)
- Height: 59.5 m (195.2 ft
- Draft: 27 ft (8 m)
- Decks: 15
- Capacity: 2,402 passengers and a max of 3,590
- Crew: 1,037

Norwegian Jade is a cruise ship for Norwegian Cruise Line (NCL), originally built as Pride of Hawaii for their NCL America division. She was christened in a ceremony at the San Pedro Pier in Los Angeles, California on 22 May 2006. The vessel is a Panamax form-factor ship that was built at Meyer Werft Shipyard, in Papenburg, Germany, and registers at just over 93,500 gross tons.

== Vessel class ==
Norwegian Jade is the second of NCL's four Jewel-class ships. She was preceded in 2005 by Norwegian Jewel, then followed in 2006 by Norwegian Pearl, and in 2007 by Norwegian Gem. Each ship has unique amenities, but has a similar exterior and interior design.

Norwegian Jade has a similar exterior appearance to NCL's ships Norwegian Star, which entered service in 2001, and Norwegian Dawn, which entered service in 2002. The interior design and amenities, however, are significantly different and merit Norwegian Jade having a Jewel class designation.

== History ==
When built, the ship comprised the third in a series of U.S. flagged ships operated by NCL America for the Hawaii market. At a cost of over half a billion U.S. dollars, Pride of Hawaii was the largest and most expensive U.S. flagged passenger ship ever built. Her design was originally planned to be a sister ship to Pride of America, utilizing parts from the Northrop Grumman Shipyard and the failed Project America series of ships. Later, NCL America decided that it would be better to enlarge Pride of Hawaii and make her a sister ship to Norwegian Jewel. The ship was christened in Los Angeles by Senator Daniel Inouye. After delivery to NCL, she joined Pride of America and Pride of Aloha as the final ship in the NCL America fleet to deliver 7-day cruises to the Hawaiian Islands of Maui, Oahu, Kauai, and the Big Island (Hawai'i).

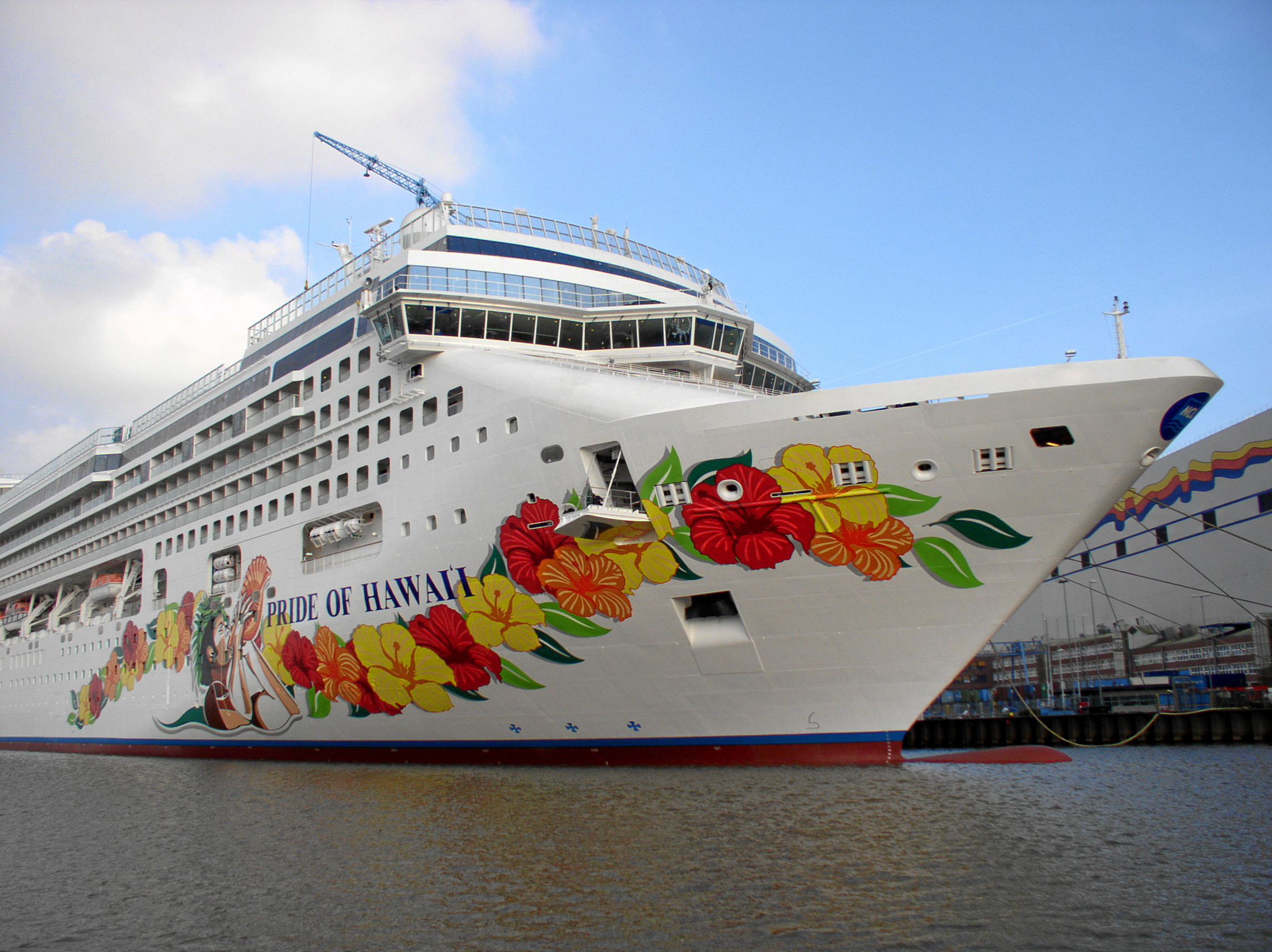
In her original livery as Pride of Hawaii

On 11 April 2007, NCL announced that Pride of Hawaii would be withdrawn from the Hawaiian market in February 2008 and subsequently re-deployed to Europe for the summer. In a press release, NCL's CEO Colin Veitch cited substantial 2006 losses that had been caused by downward pricing pressure in the Hawaii market following the addition of Pride of Hawaii to the fleet, as well as an increase in the amount of foreign flagged competition entering the Hawaii market from the west coast as the reason for the vessel's redeployment. NCL did not commit to sending Pride of Hawaii back to Hawaii until the other NCL America vessels reach an acceptable level of profitability. On 4 February 2008, Pride of Hawaii departed from Pier 2 in Honolulu for the last time. After several repositioning cruises, name change, new livery, and an added onboard casino, she made her debut in Europe. Despite the changes, Norwegian Jade maintained much of her original Hawaiian themed decor until a refit in 2017. Additionally, Matson menu-inspired artwork and a large statue of King Kamehameha graced the main dining room for many years. In November 2011, she underwent a dry dock in Marseille, France, for two weeks. The ship received new carpets and tiling throughout and the hull was repainted plus the usual annual maintenance took place. Norwegian Jade was used as a floating hotel during the 2014 Winter Olympics in Sochi.

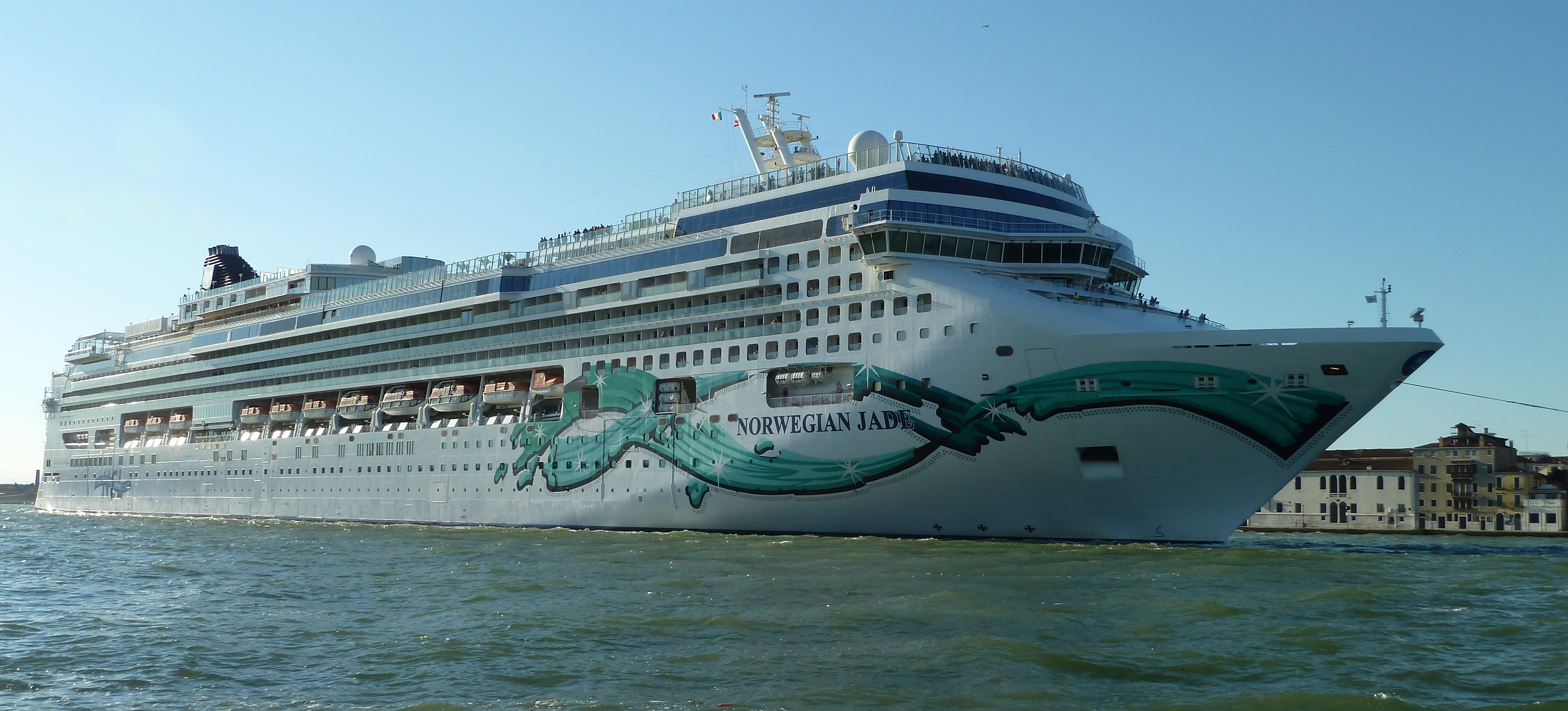
Norwegian Jade departs in Venice, Italy on August 10, 2013

The ship underwent a three-week dry dock in March 2017, replacing the Hawaiian theme with a 'contemporary style'. The ship also received two brand new restaurants and two new bars and lounges, updated design and décor in many public spaces, and a refurbishment of all staterooms with new carpets, furniture, flat screen TVs, new larger headboards with USB charging outlets.

On 6 April 2018, American rock band Paramore embarked on a special four-day voyage entitled "Parahoy!". The event saw fans embark on the Norwegian Jade on a return trip from Miami to Nassau, Bahamas. The event featured three concerts and numerous activities. Support acts Local Natives, Judah & The Lion, mewithoutYou, Now, Now, Halfnoise, and comedians Jordan Rock, and Ryan O'Flanagan also joined the voyage.

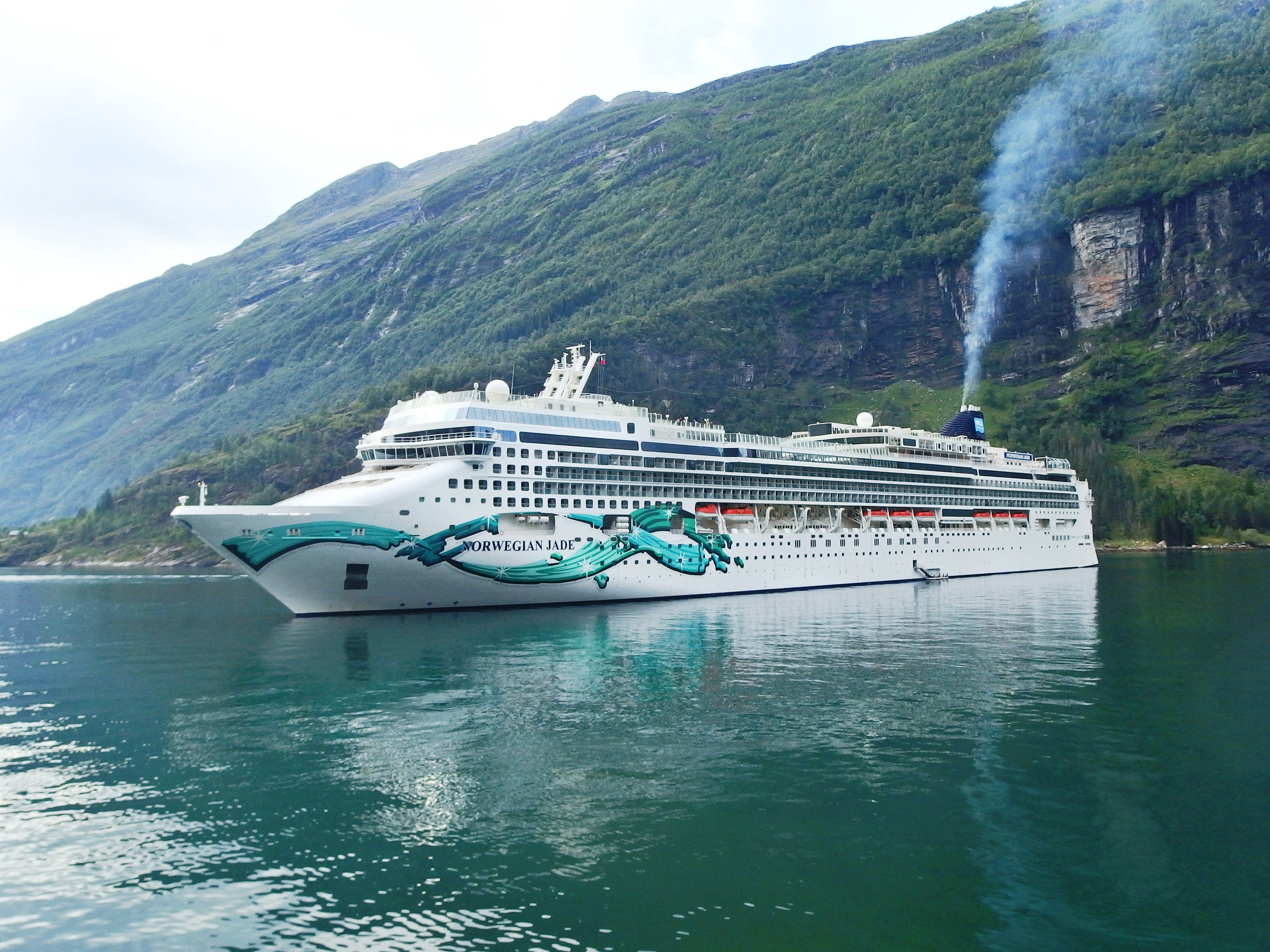
Norwegian Jade in Geirangerfjord, Norway on August 14, 2018

On 27 October 2018, professional wrestler and musician Chris Jericho hosted the first-ever Chris Jericho's Rock 'N' Wrestling Rager at Sea, a 4-day professional wrestling and rock music-themed cruise.

On 19 November 2018, Norwegian Jade experienced mechanical problems during a 10-day Southern Caribbean cruise out of Miami. While in San Juan, Puerto Rico, NCL decided to cancel the rest of the cruise, offering full refunds and credit for a future cruise on NCL. The ship underwent repairs in Miami.

On 11 September 2019, Norwegian Jade experienced mechanical issues during an 11-day Mediterranean cruise out of Rome, Italy. The malfunctions prevented the ship from reaching the port of Livorno and caused the cruise to end one day early. Guests were given $100 (per stateroom) credit for shipboard services and full refunds for any NCL-booked excursions in Livorno as compensation for the trouble.
