= Norwegian Gem =

Cruise ship

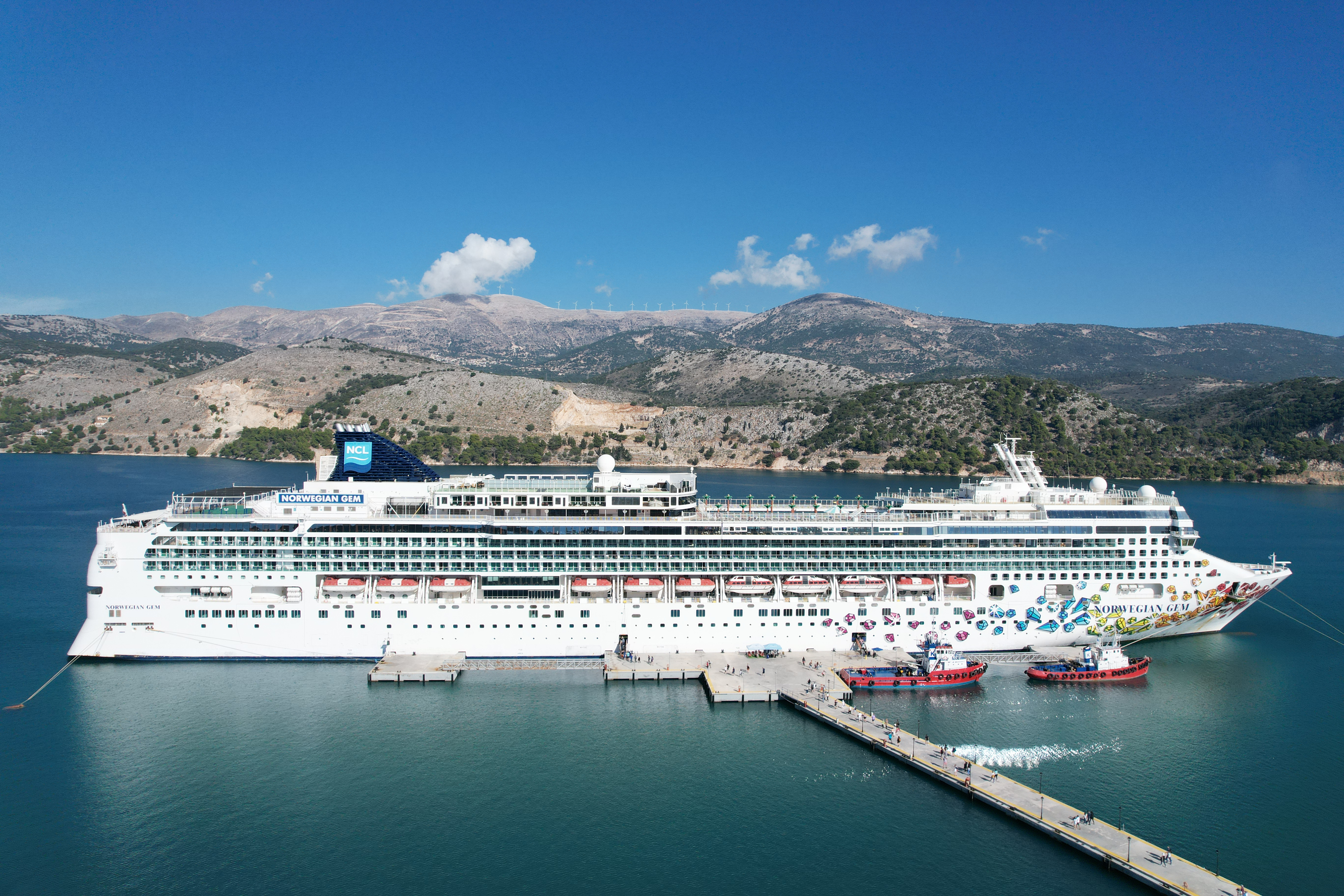
- Norwegian Gem in Argostoli, 2022

History

Bahamas
- Name: Norwegian Gem
- Owner: Norwegian Cruise Line Holdings
- Operator: Norwegian Cruise Line
- Port of registry: Nassau, Bahamas
- Ordered: 2004
- Builder: Meyer Werft; Papenburg, Germany
- Cost: US$ 700 Million
- Laid down: 17 June 2006
- Launched: 12 August 2007
- Sponsored by: Cindy Cardella
- Christened: 18 December 2007
- Acquired: 1 October 2007
- In service: 2007
- Identification: Call sign: C6VG8; IMO number: 9355733; MMSI number: 309951000
- Status: In active service

General characteristics
- Class & type: Jewel-class cruise ship
- Tonnage: 93,530 GT
- Length: 965 ft (294.13 m)
- Beam: 125 ft (38.10 m)
- Height: 59.5 m (195.2 ft
- Draft: 27 ft (8.2 m)
- Decks: 15
- Propulsion: Pod propulsion
- Speed: 25 knots (46 km/h; 29 mph)
- Capacity: 2,394 passengers
- Crew: 1,070 crew

Norwegian Gem is a Jewel-class cruise ship of Norwegian Cruise Line (NCL). She is the final cruise ship of the Jewel class and was built by German shipbuilder Meyer Werft.

== History ==
Norwegian Gem was the newest cruise ship in Norwegian Cruise Line's fleet until the debut of Norwegian Epic in June 2010. Construction began on 7 June 2006 at the Meyer Werft Shipyard of Papenburg, Germany. She was delivered to NCL on 1 October 2007. NCL promoted the launch of this ship via her own website, "Gem It Girl", which in addition to providing details about the ship, also prompted previous customers' of NCL to submit an entry to be chosen as her godmother.

On 29 October 2011, Norwegian Gem rescued five people from the 39-foot (12 m) sailboat Sanctuary which had lost power and was floating in extreme weather conditions in the Atlantic.

== Vessel class ==
Norwegian Gem is the fourth of Norwegian's Jewel class. She was preceded by Norwegian Jewel in 2005, and both Norwegian Jade (originally Pride of Hawaii) and Norwegian Pearl in 2006. Each ship has different amenities, but has a similar exterior and interior design.

Norwegian Gem has a similar exterior appearance to Norwegian's Dawn-class ships; Norwegian Star, which entered service in 2001, and Norwegian Dawn, which entered service in 2002. The interior design and amenities, however, are significantly different and merit Norwegian Gem a Jewel class designation.

== Areas of operation ==
Norwegian Gem has undertaken regional cruises from ports in North America and Europe.

== Incidents and accidents ==
=== 2018 blizzard ===
On 4 January 2018, Norwegian Gem traveled southbound passing the Norwegian Breakaway through the January 2018 North American blizzard causing major flooding in passenger staterooms.

=== COVID-19 pandemic ===
On 13 April 2020, a 56-year-old Filipino male crew member died aboard Norwegian Gem. The crew member had been treated for pneumonia and tachycardia arrhythmia. NCL claimed they did not believe he was infected with SARS-CoV-2, but appeared to have not offered any explanation as to why an autopsy was not performed, nor why he was not tested for the virus. He was disembarked at Miami by people in hazmat suits.

On 23 April, NCL sent a letter to the crew members aboard stating that another crew member, who was on the cruise ship between 31 March and 14 April, had tested positive for the virus. Notably, this letter was not sent to crew members who were no longer on the ship. (Note: It has been conjectured that this was because those crew members would have been entitled to certain benefits had they been infected with the virus while on board.)

On the morning of 30 April, the senior doctor on Norwegian Gem was found dead in his cabin. NCL claimed that he died of a heart attack in his sleep, though crew members stated that he was being treated for pneumonia and had not been tested for the virus. Also, according to crew members, a nurse who had worked closely with the doctor had reportedly tested positive for the virus after being removed from the ship.

There was concern among crew members that NCL had been hiding evidence of the virus on board Norwegian Gem, which may become an issue if NCL carries out plans to combine crews from different ships together before sailing them back home.

In July 2021, the cruise line filed a lawsuit against the surgeon general of Florida, Scott Rivkees, for forbidding the requirement from private businesses for a proof of COVID-19 vaccination. The suit is primarily against the statewide measure allowing the state to fine businesses up to $5,000 for each instance of requiring a proof of vaccination for admittance or entry into the establishment. The company argued that the prevention of vaccine documentation is in effect a violation of the freedom of speech secured by the first amendment by way of "restricting the flow of information", according to the Wall Street Journal.
