= Ems powerline crossing =

Coordinates: 53°08′52″N 7°22′21″E

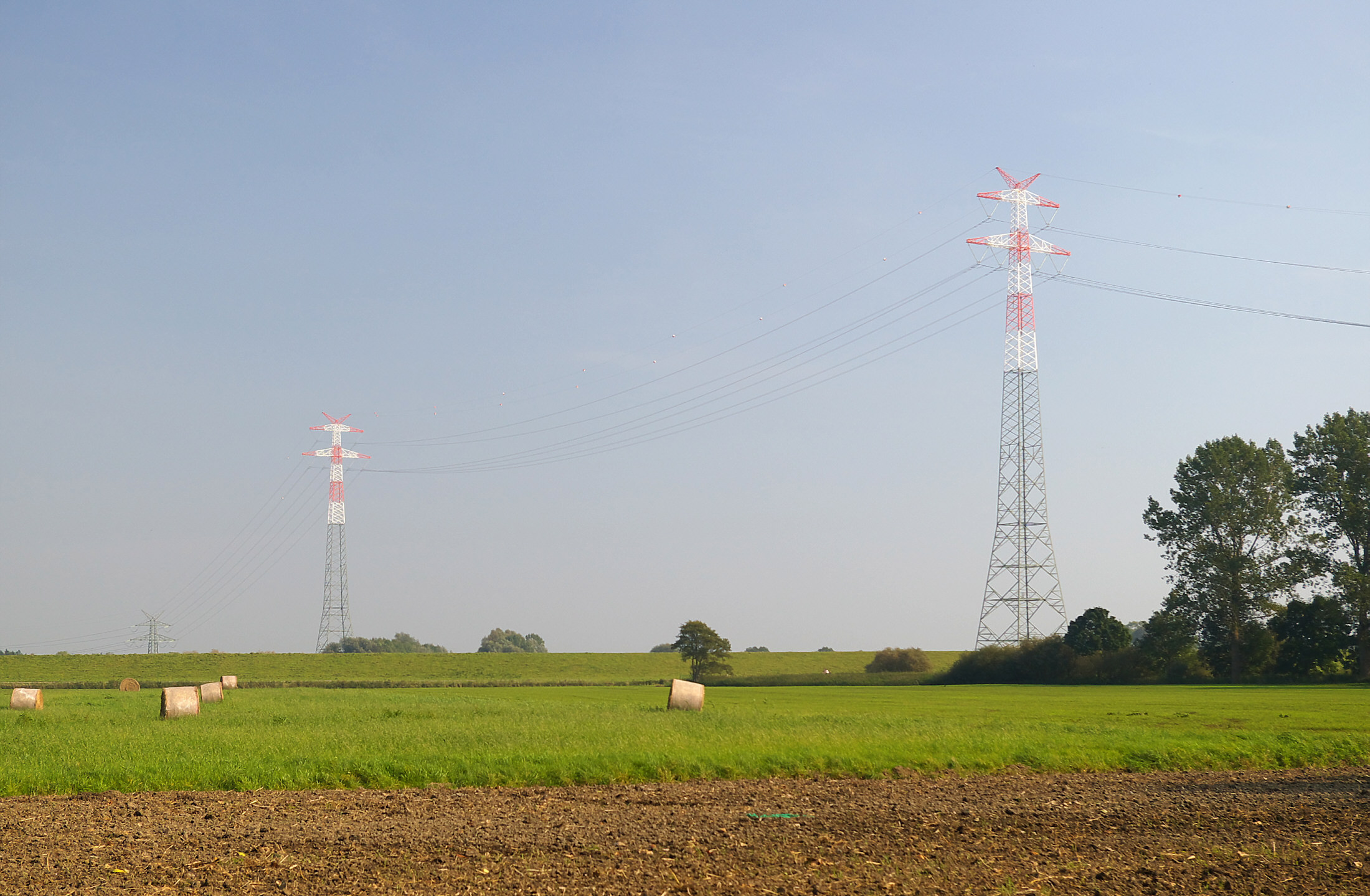
110 m tall pylons in Sept. 2007

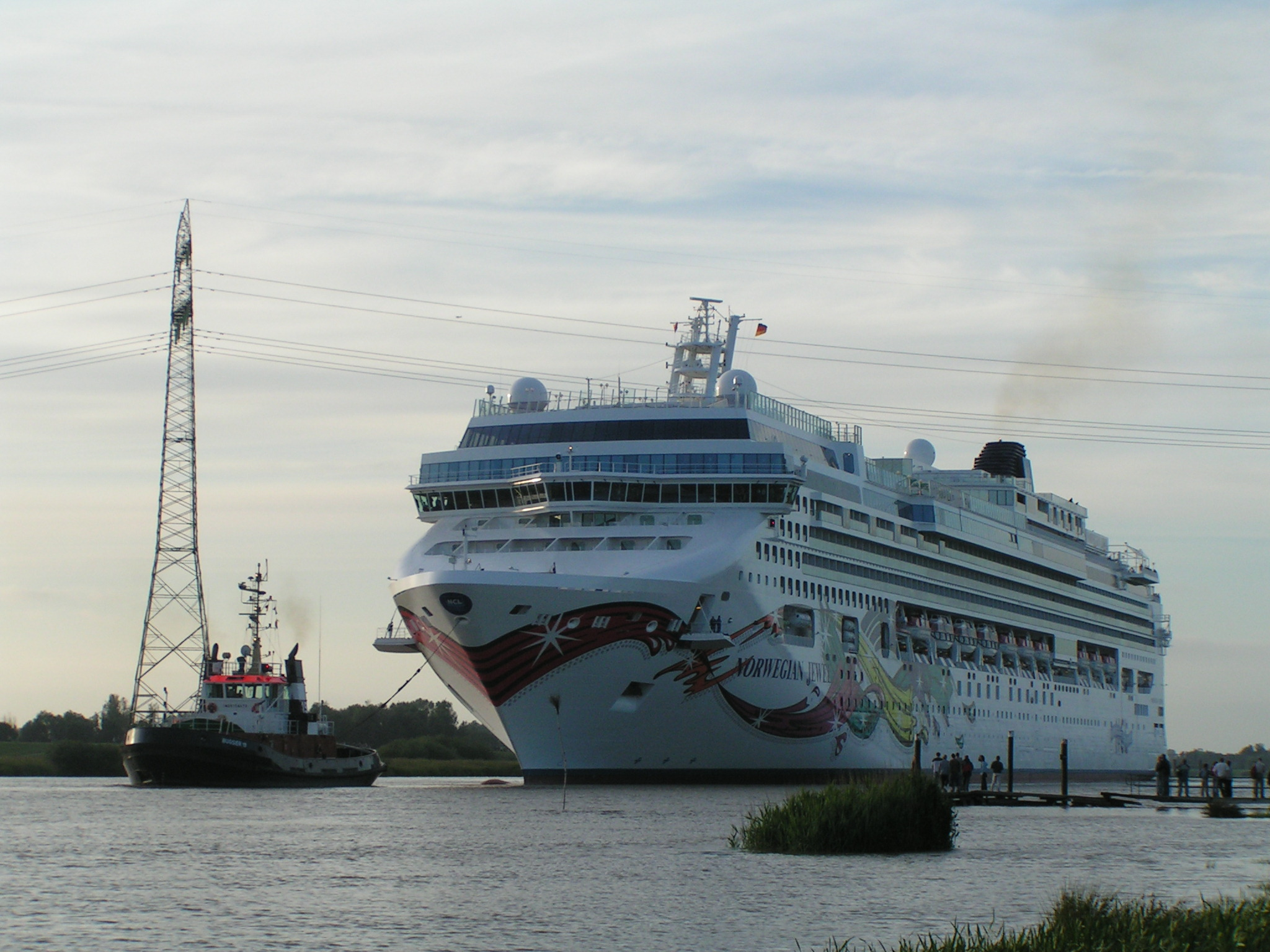
Norwegian Jewel barely passes in June 2005, with 84m pylons

The 380 kV Ems Overhead Powerline Crossing is a power line crossing for two three-phase circuits on the Ems River South of Weener, Germany. It is mounted since summer 2007 on two 110 m tall pylons with two crossbars. The length of the span is 405 m.

With smaller 84m pylons before 2007, the crossing was an obstacle for Jewel-class cruise ships built by Meyer Werft in Papenburg. Although the first two ships could pass beneath the line, the clearance was often so close that the line had to be switched off. When this procedure was followed on November 4, 2006, in order to let the third vessel Norwegian Pearl pass, the 2006 European blackout occurred in many parts of Europe. According to official reports, this was caused by the switching off of this line.

In summer 2007, the towers were rebuilt to be 26 metres (85 feet) higher to let the 4th ship pass, and future ships.
