= Hacker fare =

In airline ticketing, the term hacker fare can refer to one of these two things:

- Booking two one-way tickets to assemble a round trip for a lower fare than a single roundtrip ticket, usually on two different airlines (term coined by Kayak).
- Hidden-city ticketing
