= Norwegian Star =

2001 Norwegian cruise ship

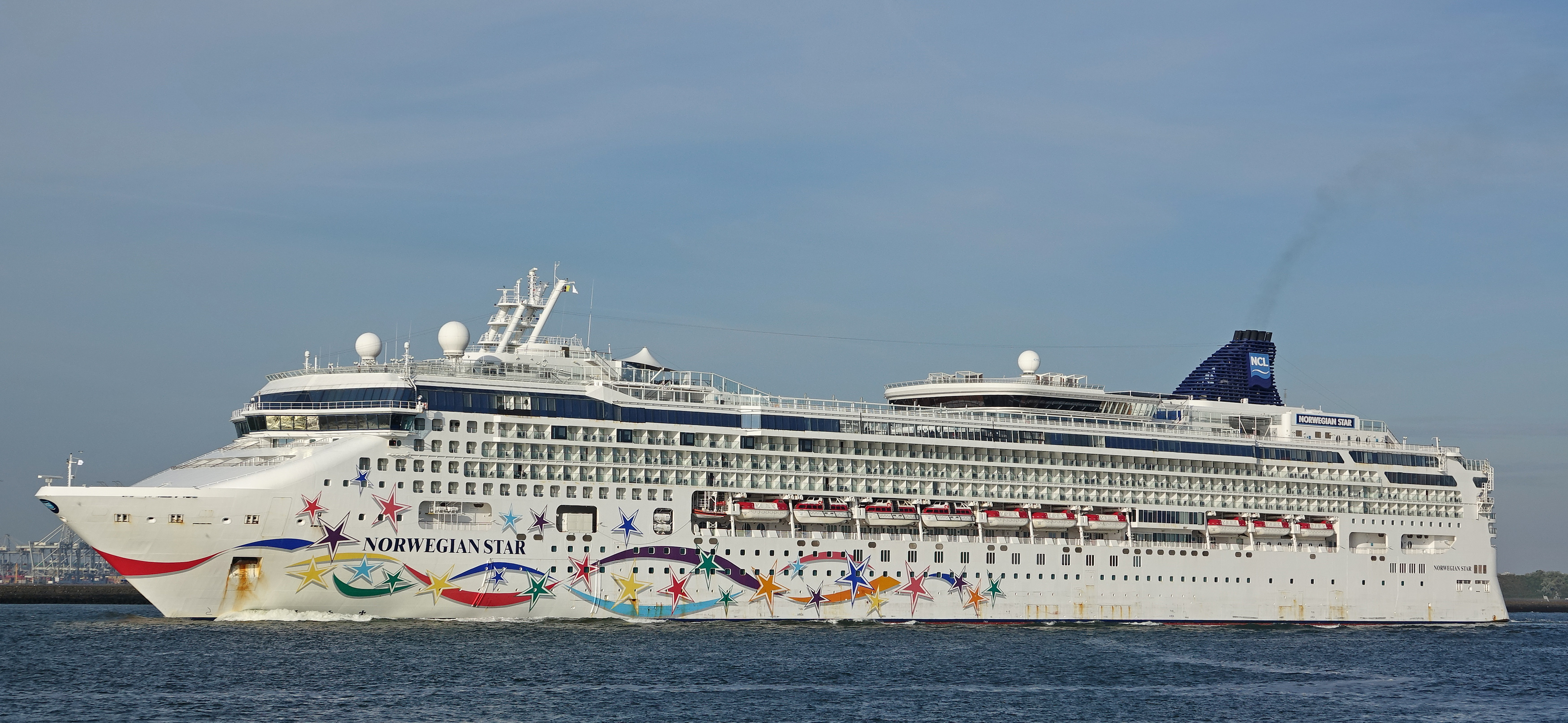
- Norwegian Star near Hook of Holland, 2020

History

Bahamas
- Name: SuperStar Libra (Construction Only); Norwegian Star (2001–present)
- Owner: Norwegian Cruise Line Holdings
- Operator: Norwegian Cruise Line
- Port of registry: Nassau, Bahamas
- Builder: Meyer Werft, Papenburg, Germany
- Cost: US$400 million
- Yard number: 648
- Laid down: 23 June 2000
- Launched: 30 September 2001
- Sponsored by: Angela Perez Baraquio
- Christened: 17 November 2001
- Maiden voyage: 19 November 2001
- In service: 19 November 2001
- Identification: Call sign: C6FR3; IMO number: 9195157; MMSI number: 311082000
- Status: In service

General characteristics
- Class & type: Dawn-class cruise ship
- Tonnage: 91,740 GT; 61,087 NT; 7,500 DWT
- Length: 294.13 m (965 ft)
- Beam: 32.2 m (105.6 ft)
- Height: 59.5 m (195.2 ft
- Draft: 8.2 m (27 ft)
- Decks: 15
- Installed power: 4 × MAN B&W 14V48/60; (4 × 14,700 kW)
- Propulsion: Diesel-electric; Two ABB Azipod units (2 × 19,500 kW); Three bow thrusters (3 × 2,390 kW)
- Speed: 24.6 knots (45.6 km/h; 28.3 mph)
- Capacity: 2,348 passengers
- Crew: 1,031

Norwegian Star is a Dawn-class cruise ship operated by Norwegian Cruise Line (NCL). Ordered by and intended for Star Cruises, it was originally named SuperStar Libra before being transferred to NCL. Norwegian Star is a Panamax cruise ship; its 294-meter-length (965 ft) and 32.2-meter-beam (105.6 ft) nears the limit for ships transiting the Panama Canal through the original set of locks. Norwegian Dawn is in the same class.

Norwegian Star was built by the Meyer Werft shipyard in Papenburg, Germany. Construction began on Norwegian Star in 2000 and was completed in mid-2001, with the ship put into service later that year. Originally circumnavigating the Hawaiian Islands since its introduction, Norwegian Star was moved to the Pacific Coast of North America in 2004.

== Design ==
Norwegian Star's gross tonnage (GT) is 91,740. She is 294 meters (965 ft) long, with a beam of 32.2 meters (105.6 ft) and a draft of 8.2 meters (27 ft). Norwegian Star is a Panamax ship and was designed at the maximum size that could be accommodated by the locks of the Panama Canal at the time. Four 14,700-kilowatt (19,700 hp) MAN B&W diesel generating sets power the ship, which can run on either diesel fuel or heavy fuel oil. Propulsion is provided by two 19,500-kilowatt (26,100 hp) Azipods built by the ABB Group, and a set of three 2,390-kilowatt (3,210 hp) bow thrusters. Norwegian Star is equipped with a pair of stabilizers with an area of 8 square meters (86 ft^{2}) each.

=== Amenities ===
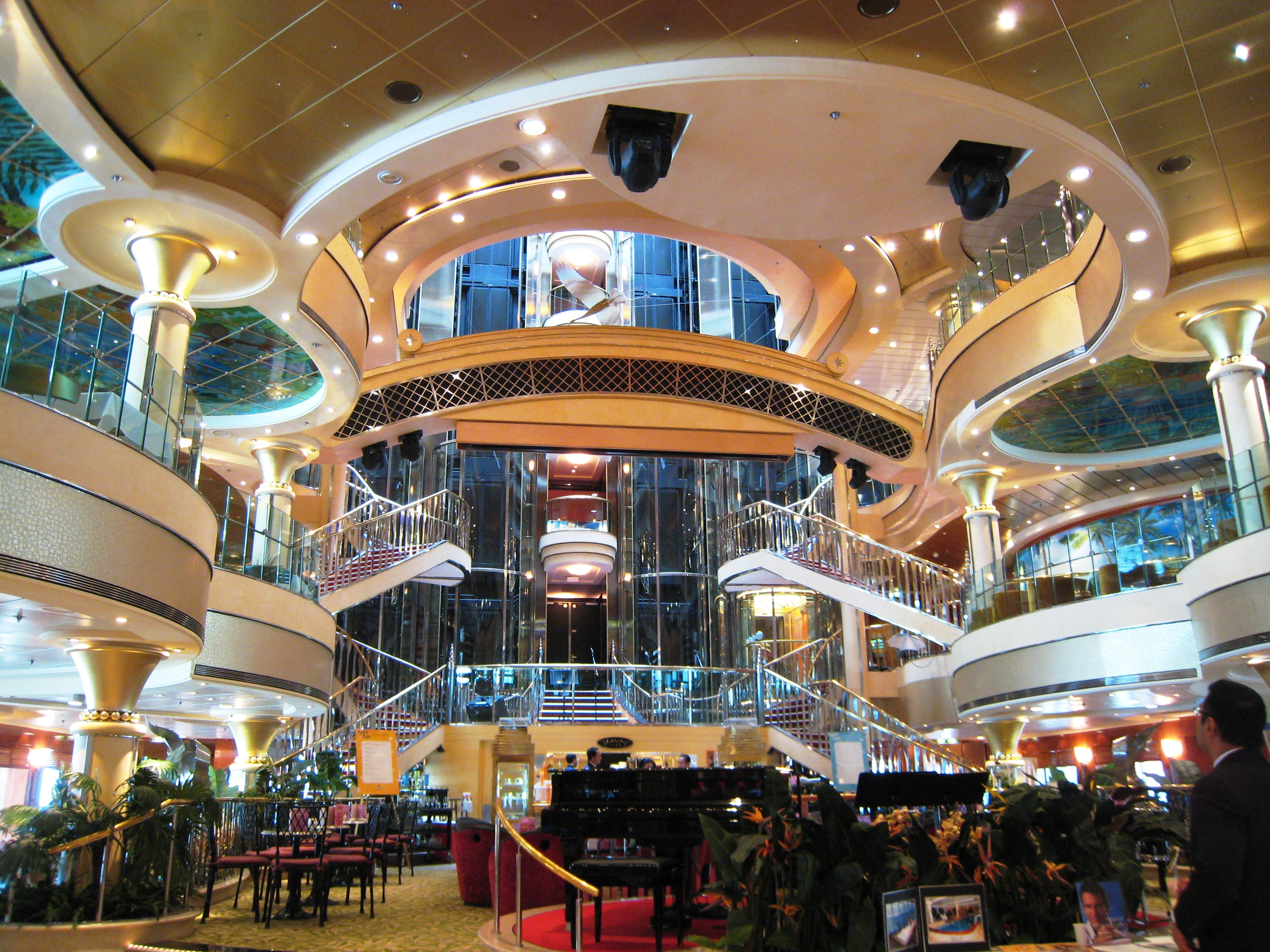
Atrium on Norwegian Star prior to 2018 refurbishment

Norwegian Star has a maximum capacity—assuming double occupancy—of 2,348 passengers. Of Norwegian Star's 1,176 cabins, 70 percent had views of the ocean. Unusual, for a cruise ship, are its twin 220-square-meter (2,370 ft^{2}), three-bedroom, suites situated atop the ship complete with private garden and sundeck. When built, Norwegian Star was also one of the few cruise ships built without a casino, something that was prohibited by Hawaiian law; a 900-square-meter (10,000 ft^{2}) casino was added in 2005 when she was repositioned. Because the ship was ordered by Star Cruises and to be based out of Singapore, the decor and layout of Norwegian Star was meant to appeal to Asian and Australian passenger rather than Americans where she was ultimately based. The Norwegian Star has ten different dining areas.

== History ==
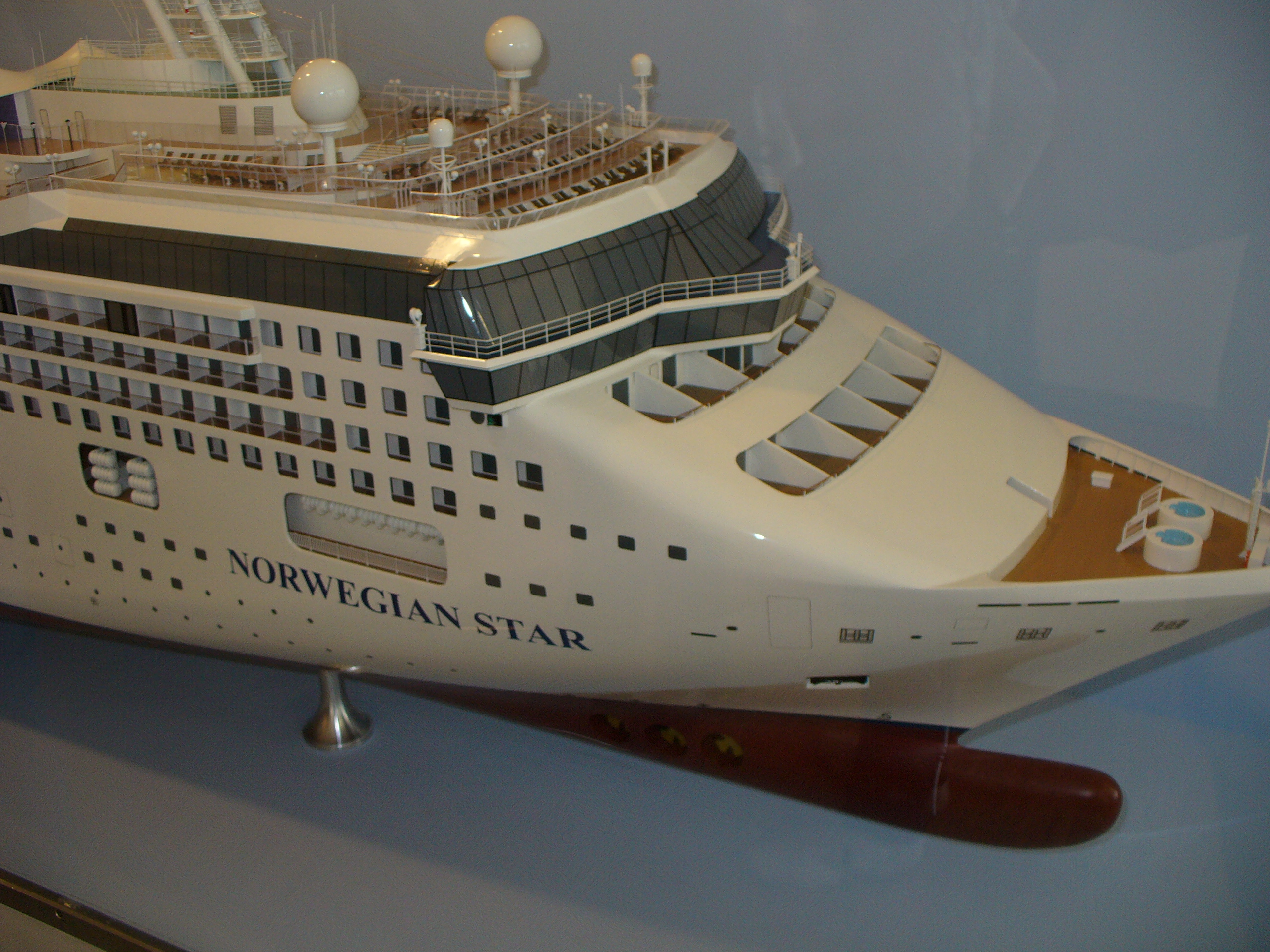
A model of the Norwegian Star as built by NCL

Norwegian Star was originally intended to operate with Star Cruises under the name SuperStar Libra. The plans for SuperStar Libra were unveiled on 7 June 1999, with the vessel costing US$400 million. She was to be the first of two Libra-class vessels constructed by the German shipyard Meyer Werft. The first of 60 prefabricated "blocks" of SuperStar Libra was laid on 23 June 2000. When the Norwegian Cruise Line (NCL) was bought by Star Cruises, SuperStar Libra and the second Libra-class cruise ship, SuperStar Scorpio, were transferred to NCL in March 2001.

Under NCL, SuperStar Libra was renamed Norwegian Star and SuperStar Scorpio became Norwegian Dawn; subsequently Libra class became referred to as Dawn class. On 30 September 2001, Norwegian Star was floated-out from the shipyard's building dock to its fitting-out pier. Two days later, she departed Papenburg and transited the Ems. The vessel was christened on 17 November 2001 at the Miami, Florida in a dual ceremony with another NCL ship, Norwegian Sun. Originally, the ship was built in the smaller building hall ("Baudock 1), but transferred in the new, bigger hall ("Baudock 2") in June 2001.

Norwegian Star entered regular service on 16 December with cruises around the Hawaiian Islands. In 2004, she was moved to the West Coast for cruises to Alaska in the summer and to the Mexican Riviera in the winter. Norwegian Star gained the addition of hull art, a new steakhouse and a casino as part of the transfer. The ship was replaced in Hawaii with the newly refurbished Pride of Aloha.

Norwegian Star was chartered to serve as a floating hotel for the 2010 Winter Olympics in Vancouver, British Columbia, Canada, however the deal was cancelled because of financial costs and lack of demand. The cancellation allowed NCL the extra two weeks to move up a refurbishment planned for late 2011. Norwegian Star entered drydock at the Victoria Shipyards in nearby Victoria on 16 February. The majority of the renovations consisted of the relocation of the gift shops and lounge, as well as the addition of 58 new suites and staterooms; a similar project was carried out on Norwegian Dawn a year later. Norwegian Star left Victoria on 2 March and returned to service four days later.

Norwegian Star was repositioned in October 2011 to Tampa, Florida and the western Caribbean Sea instead of returning to the Mexican Riviera. In summer 2012, she was moved from Alaska to New York City. Norwegian Star replaced Norwegian Gem in cruises to Bermuda from April to October. In return for coming to New York, the slightly larger Norwegian Jewel replaced Norwegian Star in Alaska. She wintered in New Orleans, Louisiana where she replaced Norwegian Spirit. Starting 2013, Norwegian Star alternates between northern Europe and the Baltic Sea in the summer, and the Mexican Riviera and Panama Canal cruises in winter.

In March 2015, the ship was brought to Vigor Industrial's dry dock in Portland, Oregon for maintenance, including repairs to the Azipod units. During the refit, maintenance was performed on its bow thrusters and stabilizers, as well as the Azipod units, ballast and bilge piping were replaced, a low-resistance silicone paint aimed at increasing fuel efficiency was applied to the hull, and the release mechanisms for the lifeboat tenders were upgraded. The Norwegian Star's dining and entertainment spaces were also renovated and digital signage, first introduced on the Norwegian Breakaway, was installed.

Norwegian Star underwent a refurbishment in summer 2018 during which it received the Sky High Bar (which replaced the Bier Garten), the Bliss Ultra Lounge (replaced Spinnaker Lounge, which moved to the former Observation Lounge) and the adults-only Spice H2O. Additionally, all cabins and suites were outfitted with USB charging ports.

The Norwegian Star was refurbished again in 2021. The Spinnaker Lounge was replaced with additional cabins. In 2024, it received Starlink high-speed internet.

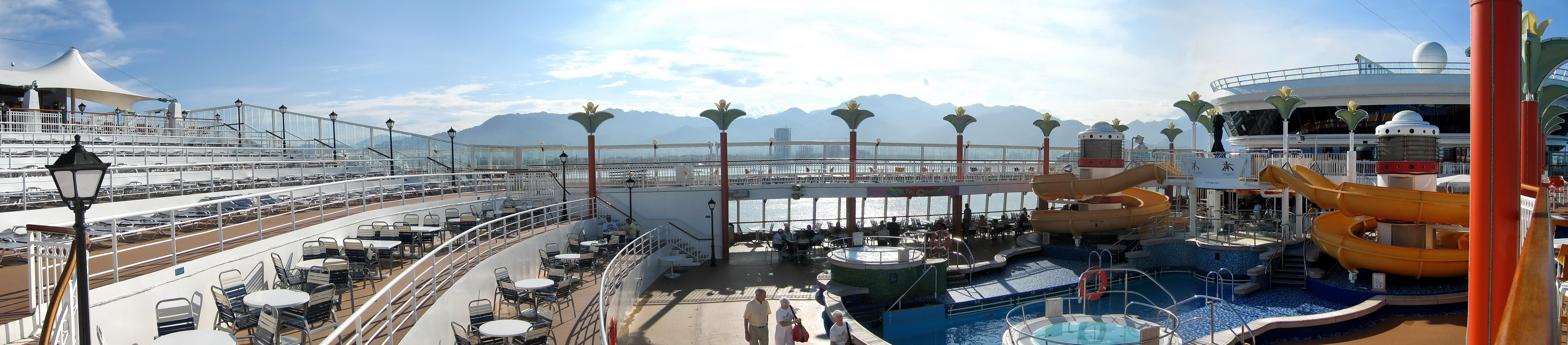
Panorama of Norwegian Star pool deck, 2006

== Accidents and incidents ==
=== Azipod problems ===
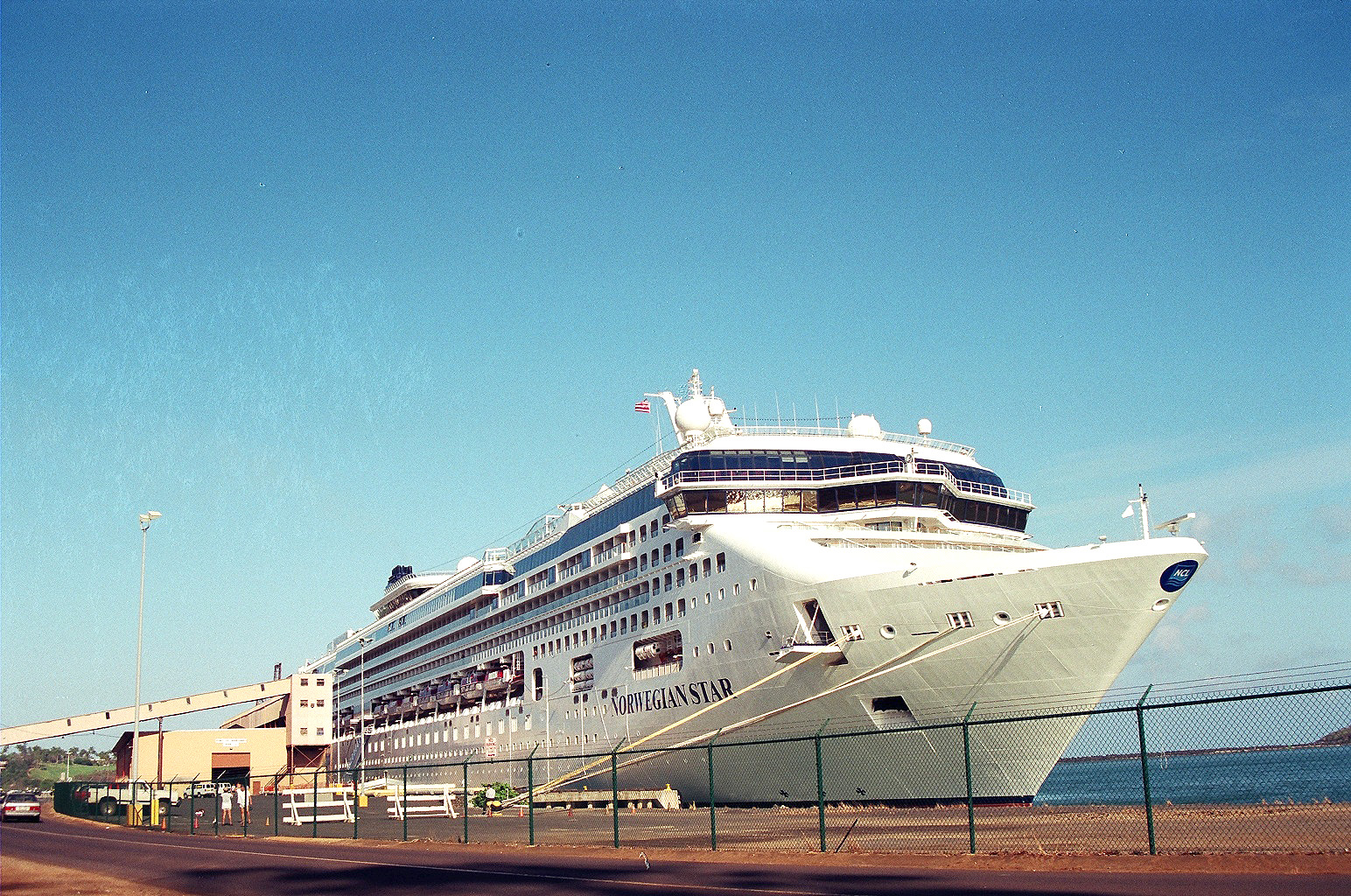
Norwegian Star docked in Kauai in 2002 before application of hull art

Damage to the forward thrust bearing in Norwegian Star's Azipod system in April 2004 caused the suspension of trips to Fanning Island, Kiribati. Because of the damage, the ship was restricted to 18 knots (33 km/h; 21 mph) instead of the 25-knot-speed (46 km/h; 29 mph) needed to make the journey around Hawaii and to Kiribati in the week allotted for the cruise. The stopovers in Kiribati were required under the Passenger Vessel Services Act of 1886 whereby non-U.S. flagged ships are prohibited from departing and returning to a U.S. port without first calling at a foreign port. The penalties associated with skipping a foreign port were waived for NCL on account of the damage. A revised itinerary with stops in Kailua and Lahaina was substituted until the end of April, and the repositioning cruise to Vancouver was cancelled to allow Norwegian Star to go into drydock early.

Additional problems with the Azipods forced NCL take the Norwegian Star out-of-service for two weeks in April 2015, and cancel its repositioning cruise through the Panama Canal. In December 2016, problems with one of the Azipods delayed Norwegian Star's departure from Singapore and forced the curtailing of additional itineraries. Azipod failures occurred again in January 2017 between Singapore and Bali, leading to further itinerary changes and then in February 2017, when the ship's Azipods failed off the coast of Victoria, Australia requiring it to be towed to Melbourne.

=== New York City docking incidents ===
On 27 April 2012, Norwegian Star struck the pier where the aircraft carrier USS Intrepid, the centerpiece of the Intrepid Sea, Air & Space Museum, was docked while she attempted to dock at the nearby New York Passenger Ship Terminal in Manhattan. Intrepid was, at the time of incident, being prepared for the flyover of the Shuttle Carrier Aircraft with the Space Shuttle Enterprise later that morning. No injuries were reported and the incident was blamed on high winds and low tide.

While docking at the terminal in New York on 8 July, Norwegian Star generated a larger-than-normal wake from its thrusters to keep the ship positioned correctly in strong currents. The waves rocked the cruise missile submarine USS Growler, an exhibit at the Intrepid Sea, Air & Space Museum, damaging the gangway and causing it to fall into the water. The United States Coast Guard stated that the maneuvering procedures were normal, noting if "One vessel created a wake. The other vessel just bobbed in the water, and that's what vessels do." Growler remained accessible to visitors when the museum opened for the day.

=== Bermuda mooring incident ===
Sudden gale-force winds struck the Royal Naval Dockyard in Bermuda, where Norwegian Star was docked, on 14 September 2012. The winds caused Norwegian Star to break its mooring and hit the stern of Royal Caribbean's Explorer of the Seas. Neither ship suffered any major damage. After the incident, Norwegian Star was held in place off of Heritage Wharf by two anchors and two tugboats.

=== Woman overboard incident ===
On 18 August 2018, a British woman fell off the Norwegian Star in the Adriatic Sea, about 95 kilometers off Croatia's coast. She spent about 10 hours in the water before she was rescued by a Croatian rescue ship. After examining CCTV footage investigators found that she jumped over board intentionally.

== See also ==
- List of cruise ships

== Sources ==
- Miller, Laurence (July–August 2002). "Norwegian Star: Innovative Vessel Custom-Designed for 'Freestyle Cruising'". Cruise Travel. 24 (1): 34–39.
- Schwartzman, M. T. (July–August 2005). "Refit/Refurb/Rebuild". Cruise Travel. 27 (1): 16–18.
