= Gaselys =

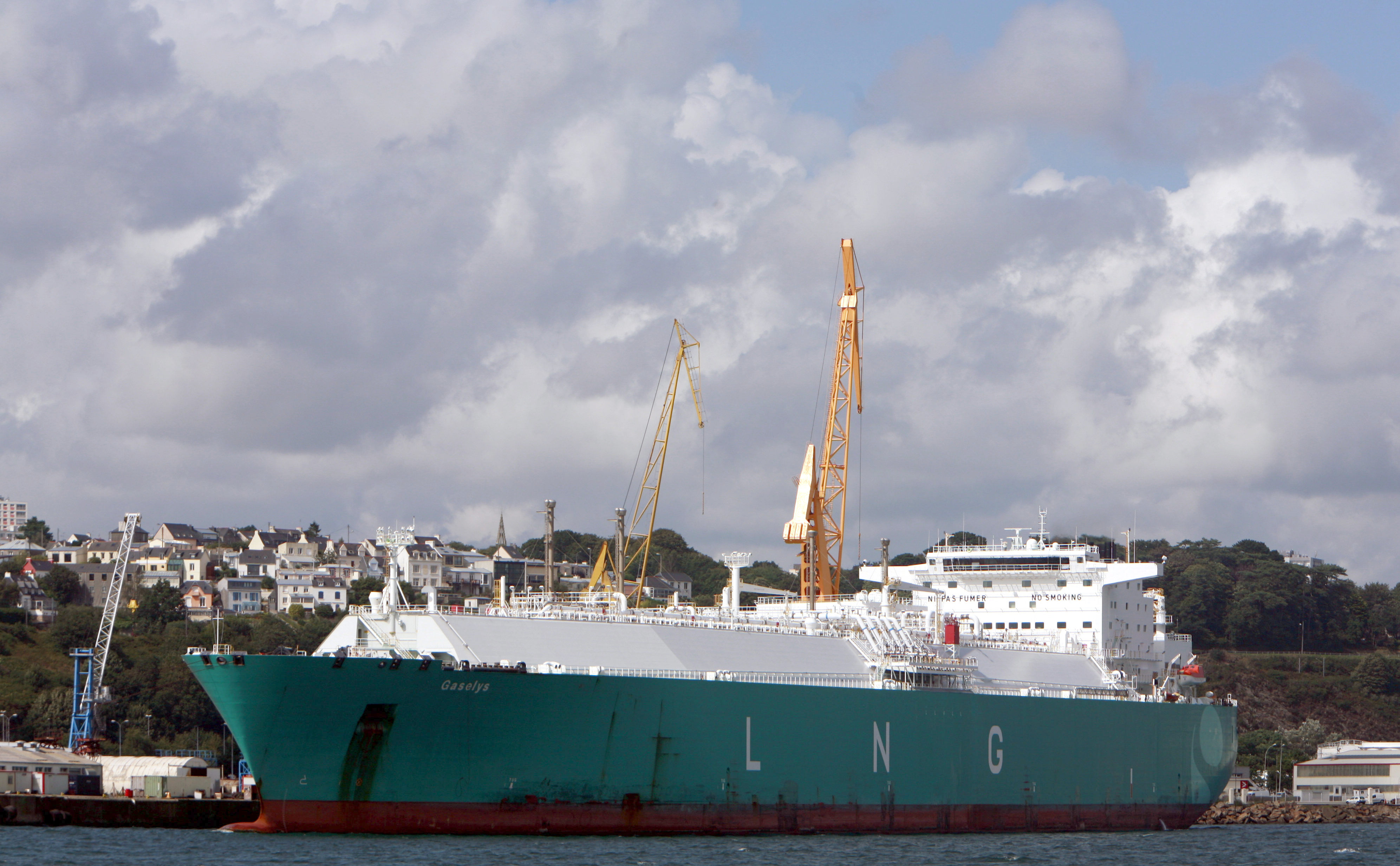
- Gaselys in Brest harbour

History
- Name: Gaselys
- Owner: NYK Armateur
- Operator: Gazocéan (Gaz de France)
- Builder: Chantiers de l'Atlantique
- Launched: 25 May 2006
- Completed: 5 March 2007
- Identification: IMO number: 9320075; MMSI number: 228333700; Callsign: FMLU
- Status: in active service

General characteristics
- Class & type: LNG carrier
- Length: 290 m (950 ft)
- Beam: 43.5 m (143 ft)
- Draught: 11.6 m (38 ft)
- Capacity: 154,500 m^{3} (5,460,000 cu ft) of Methane

Gaselys is a LNG carrier of Gaz de France. When taken into service in 2007, she and her sister ship Provalys were the largest LNG carriers in existence.
