= MV Finnland =

Container ship

History

United Kingdom
- Name: Finnland
- Owner: Navalis GmbH & Co. KG
- Launched: 28 June 2005
- Identification: IMO number: 9301598; MMSI number: 235010600; Callsign: MLGJ9

General characteristics
- Type: Container ship
- Tonnage: 5,257 GT; 2,697 NT; 7,098 tonnes deadweight (DWT)
- Length: 117 m (384 ft) LOA
- Beam: 16 m (52 ft)
- Draught: 6 m (20 ft)
- Propulsion: 3840 kW MaK 8M32C MCR
- Speed: 12.5 knots (23.2 km/h; 14.4 mph)
- Capacity: 324 TEU

MV Finnland is a container ship launched in 2005.
