= One-way travel =

Transport ticket

One-way travel or one way is a travel paid by a fare purchased for a trip on an aircraft, a train, a bus, or some other mode of travel without a return trip. One-way tickets may be purchased for a variety of reasons, such as if one is planning to permanently relocate to the destination, is uncertain of one's return plans, has alternate arrangements for the return, or if the traveler is planning to return, but there is no need to pay the fare in advance. For some modes of travel, often for buses, trams or metros, return tickets may not be available at all.

For air trips, normal return tickets are valid for 12 months or 365 days, so in the case of a passenger that wants to stay at the destination for more than 365 days (12 months in one year) then a one-way ticket is advised by airlines and travel agents.

Depending on the provider, buying two one-way tickets may or may not be more expensive than buying a round trip ticket. At times, buying two one-way tickets may actually be less expensive, especially if the two tickets are on different airlines.

The hijackers involved in the September 11 attacks purchased one-way tickets, and in aftermath of the attacks, purchasers of one-way airline tickets were in some cases subject to a higher risk of additional security screening.

== See also ==
- Repositioning cruise
