= COSCO Guangzhou =

Container ship

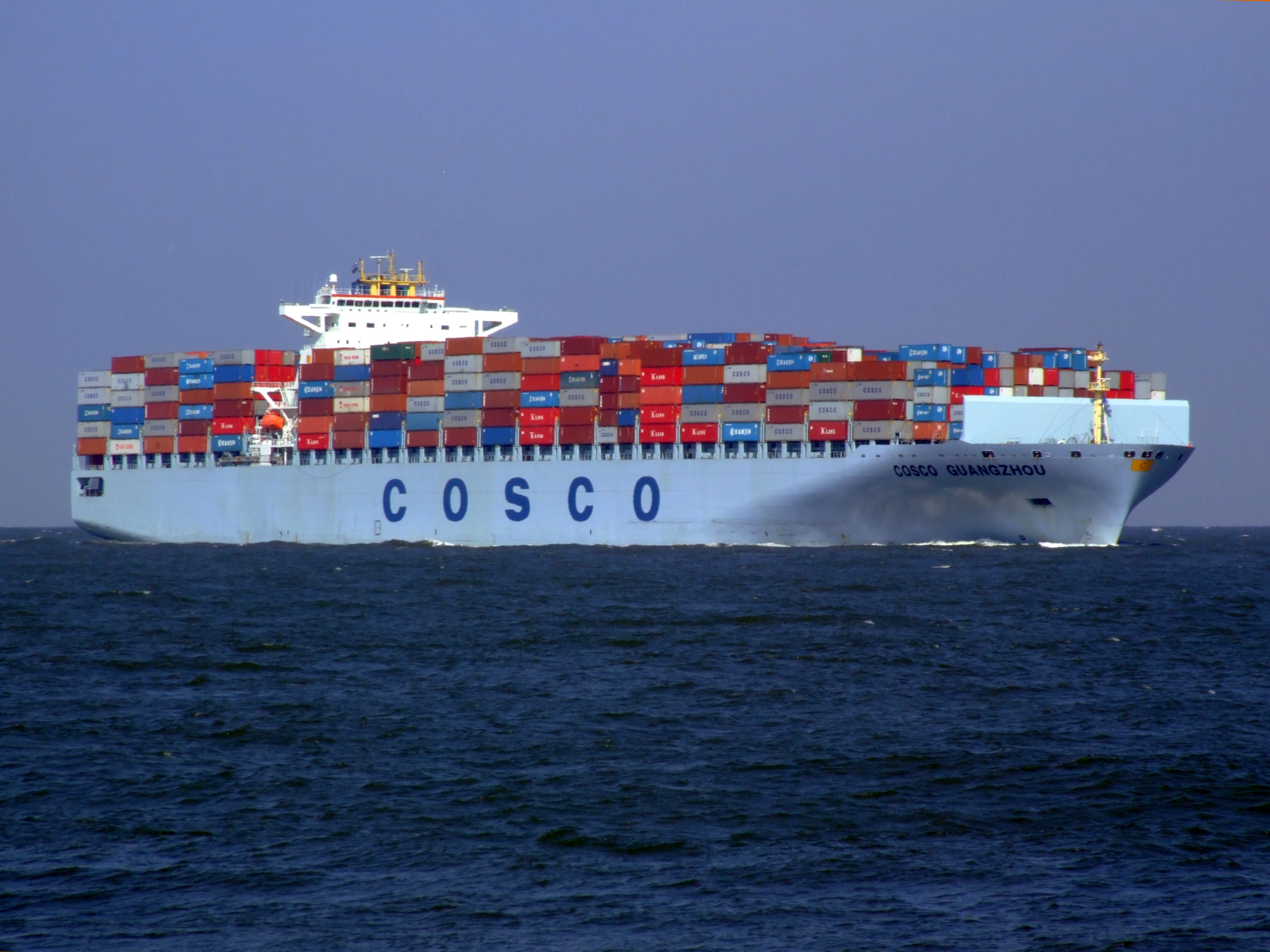
- COSCO Guangzhou approaching Port of Rotterdam

History
- Name: COSCO Guangzhou
- Port of registry: Valletta,Malta
- Ordered: 25 July 2003
- Builder: Hyundai Heavy Industries
- Laid down: 4 October 2005
- Launched: 9 December 2005
- Identification: Call sign: 9HA4043; IMO number: 9305570; MMSI number: 240475000
- Status: In service

General characteristics
- Class & type: container ship
- Tonnage: 107,000 DWT; 99,833 GT
- Length: 350 m (1,150 ft)
- Beam: 43 m (141 ft)
- Draft: 11.5 m (38 ft)
- Propulsion: Mitsubishi diesel engine; 52,650 hp
- Speed: 25.6 knots (47 km/h) (maximum); 24.5 knots (45 km/h) (cruising)
- Capacity: 9,500 containers

COSCO Guangzhou is a container ship built for Cosco Ship Management in 2006. The ship has capacity for 9,500 TEU and mostly sails between the ports in China, India and Japan and those in Western Europe and the United States.

== Design ==
COSCO Guangzhou is 350 meters long, with a beam of 43 meters. The fully loaded draft is 11.50 meters, giving a deadweight tonnage of 107,000 tonnes and a gross tonnage of 99,833 GT. The ship features several new design innovations, including a type of paint that decreases water resistance. The ship's Mitsubishi engines provide 52,650 hp, and a cruising speed of 24.5 knots. The fuel and lubricant oil consumption are 4% less than in a comparable ship. Her bridge equipment includes an Automatic Identification System (AIS), GPS, Differential GPS (dGPS), an Automatic Radar Plotting Aid (ARPA), and an Electronic chart system (ECDIS) for automatically plotting the ship's position against charts. Computerized systems also assist in loading and unloading the cargo.
