= Bornholm Express =

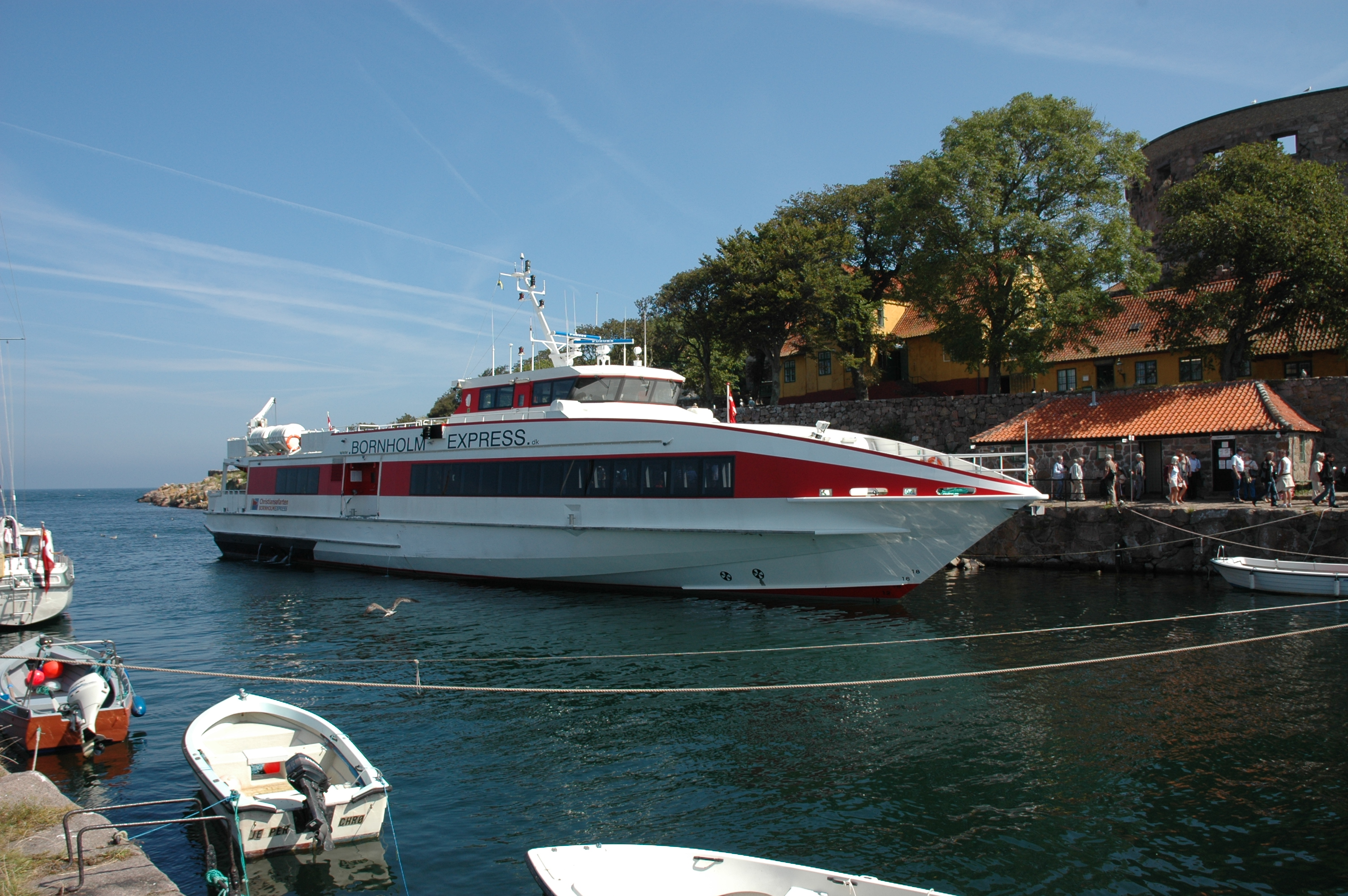
- Bornholm Express

History
- Name: Bornholm Express
- Owner: Christansøfarten
- Port of registry: (Denmark) Gudhjem
- Ordered: 28 May 2004
- Builder: Damen Group
- Yard number: 082
- Launched: February 2006
- Completed: March 2006
- Maiden voyage: 8 April 2006
- In service: 1 June 2006
- Identification: Callsign: OYGF; IMO number: 9356476; MMSI number: 220451000

General characteristics
- Type: Passenger ship
- Tonnage: 322 GT
- Length: 41.00 m (134 ft 6 in)
- Beam: 8.00 m (26 ft 3 in)
- Depth: 2.30 m (7 ft 7 in)
- Installed power: 3 × Caterpillar C32 diesel engines
- Propulsion: 3 × screw propellers
- Speed: 25 knots (46 km/h)
- Capacity: 245 passengers

Bornholm Express is a fast passenger ferry built in 2006 by Damen, Gorinchem, Netherlands. It is currently in active service.

== Construction ==
Bornholm Express was built in Singapore in 2006 by Damen Group, Gorinchem, the Netherlands as yard number 082. The ship is a 322 GT monohull design constructed of aluminium. Bornholm Express is 41.00 metres (134 ft 6 in) long, with a beam of 8.00 metres (26 ft 3 in) and a depth of 2.30 metres (7 ft 7 in). She is powered by three Caterpillar C32 diesel engines driving three screw propellers via reverse reduction gearboxes. Each engine is rated at 1,645 kilowatts (2,206 hp) at 2,300 rpm. She is capable of 25 knots (46 km/h).

== History ==
Bornholm Express was ordered by Christansøfarten Aps, Gudhjem on 28 May 2004. Launched in February 2006, she was completed in March 2006 and the loaded on board MV Pancaldo for delivery. On 8 April 2006, she was unloaded in Copenhagen and then sailed to Gudhjem. She entered service on 1 June 2006. She uses the call sign OYGF, and is allocated the IMO number 9356476 and MMSI number 220451000. Her port of registry is Gudhjem.

Bornholm Express is licensed to carry 245 passengers. She serves routes between Simrishamn, Sweden and Allinge, Bornholm, Denmark. It also serves Christiansø. It takes about 60 minutes to get to Allinge from Simrishamn and 40 minutes to Christiansø. In May and September, Bornholm Express runs between Bornholm and Kolobrzeg (Poland).

Update 3-Sep-2018: This vessel no longer sails between Sweden and Bornholm.
