= Repositioning cruise =

Cruise that does not start and stop at the same point

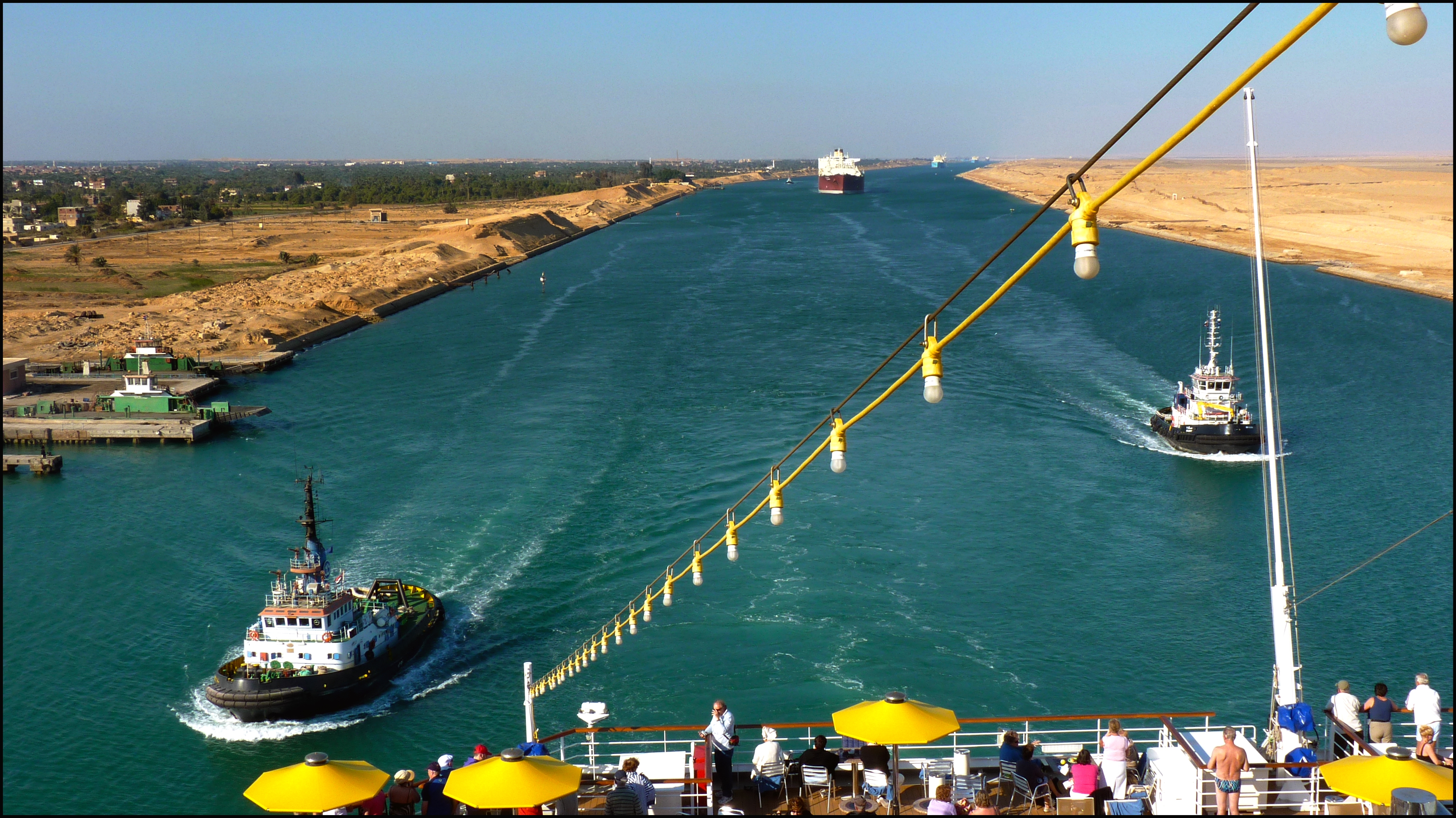
View of the Suez Canal taken from a cruise ship on a repositioning cruise

A repositioning cruise (informal: repo cruise) is a cruise in which the embarkation port and the disembarkation port are different. This is a less common type of cruise; in the majority of cruises the ship's final destination is the same as the starting point.

Some cruise ships relocate due to change in season (usually during the spring or fall) or economic conditions (a cruise line may relocate a ship when it forecasts demand to be greater in another region). Instead of repositioning an empty ship, cruise lines operate repositioning cruises.

Many cruise ships spend the summer in Europe and the winter in the Caribbean, as a cold winter in Europe decreases the demand for seasonal cruising there. Similarly, some ships cruise to Alaska from the Pacific Northwest in the summer and for winter reposition to the Caribbean through the Panama Canal or to the South Pacific. More recently, cruise ships have also repositioned to Dubai or Asia as economic growth has increased the demand for cruising there.

Repositioning cruises are generally cheaper because most passengers will have to combine them with a one-way airline ticket. Also, most passengers prefer port-intensive cruises (cruises which visit a lot of ports of call and have few days at sea), while some repositioning cruises have many days at sea, such as when crossing the Atlantic Ocean. The lower cruise price is partially offset by greater revenue on board the ship. Passengers typically spend more on-board (casino, beverages and on-board shopping) during a day at sea than they do when visiting a port of call. Alternatively, these cruises can be used as an alternative to a one-way airline ticket, for people who have the time (repositioning cruises usually last more than a week).
