= Jewel-class cruise ship =

Class of cruise ships

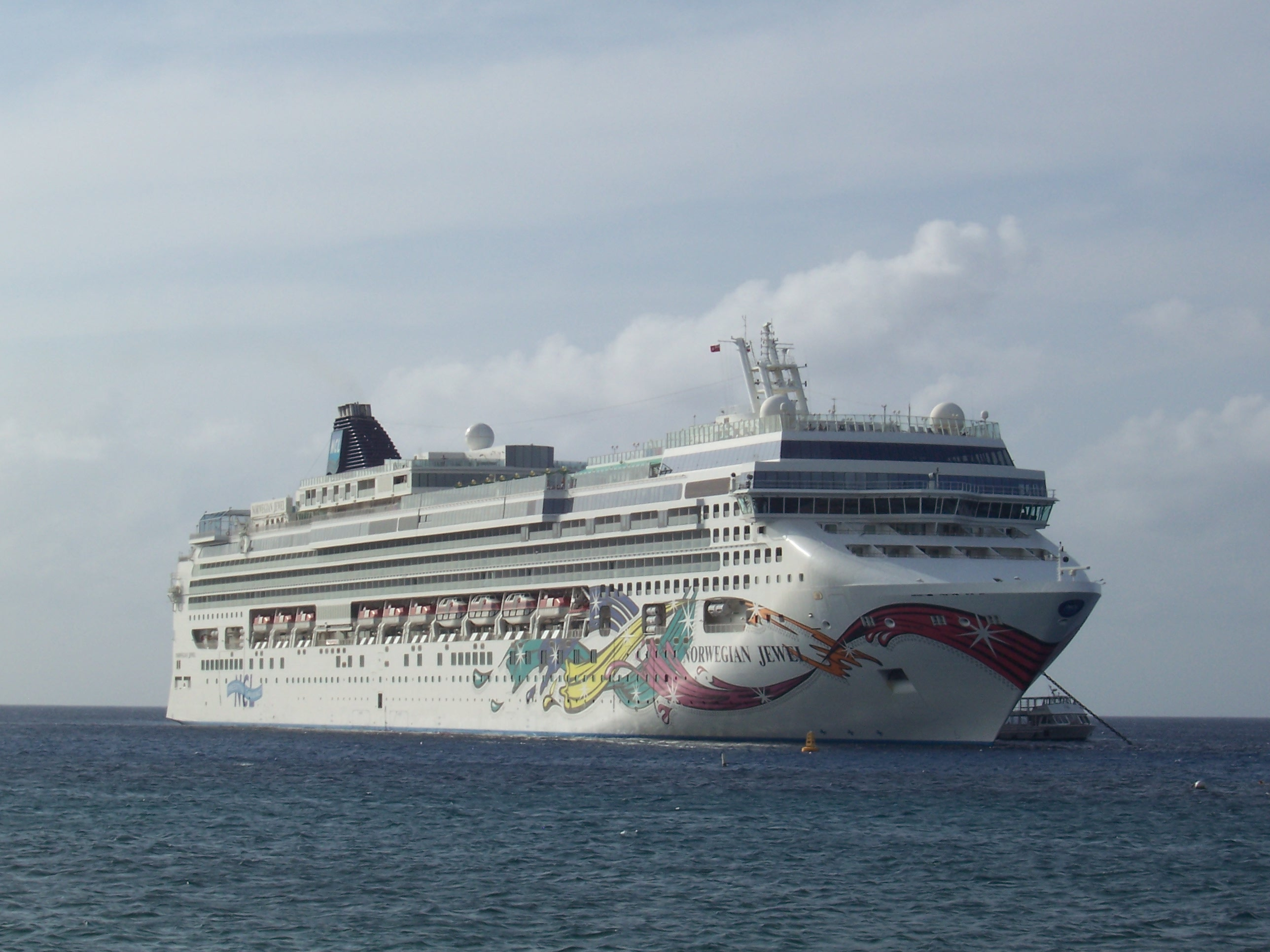
- The lead vessel, Norwegian Jewel anchored in George Town, Grand Cayman

Class overview
- Name: Jewel class
- Builders: Meyer Werft
- Operators: Norwegian Cruise Line
- Preceded by: Libra class
- Succeeded by: Epic class
- Built: 2004–2007
- In service: 2005–present
- Planned: 4
- Completed: 4
- Active: 4

General characteristics
- Type: Cruise ship
- Tonnage: 93,500 GT; 7,500 DWT
- Length: 294.13 m (965 ft 0 in)
- Beam: 32.2 m (105 ft 8 in)
- Height: 59.5 m (195 ft 3 in)
- Draught: 8.30 m (27 ft 3 in)
- Decks: 15 decks
- Propulsion: Azipod
- Speed: 25 knots (46 km/h; 29 mph)
- Capacity: 2,376–2,669 passengers
- Crew: 1,500
- Notes: Panamax cruise ships

The Jewel class is a class of cruise ships operated by the Norwegian Cruise Line (NCL) and was built by Meyer Werft of Germany. The Jewel class became NCL's largest ships, until the construction of Norwegian Epic, at 153,000 GT, in 2009 at STX Europe in St. Nazaire, which is also owned by NCL. The lead ship, Norwegian Jewel was delivered in August 2005 and the last vessel, Norwegian Gem was delivered in October 2007; however, the second ship of the class Norwegian Jade (originally built as Pride of Hawaii) was originally intended for NCL America. After sailing for the line in two years (2006–2008), Pride of Hawaii proved to be unsuccessful as the intra-Hawaiian market could not profitably accommodate more than one cruise ship. In 2008, NCL decided to transfer Pride of Hawaii to their fleet, leaving Pride of America as the sole vessel sailing the intra-Hawaii market. After receiving her current NCL livery, Pride of Hawaii was rechristened as Norwegian Jade and sailed for NCL in 2008.

== Overview ==
The Jewel class are the fourth largest ships in the NCL fleet, being preceded by the near-identical Dawn class, and is surpassed by the 153,000 GT Norwegian Epic. These ships have Panamax dimensions, enabling them to transit through the original Panama Canal locks.

These ships are the second batch of ships to have hull art, reflecting the name of each ship.

== History ==
Norwegian Jewel and Pride of Hawaii were ordered initially and a further two ships, Norwegian Pearl and Norwegian Gem followed in 2004.

Pride of Hawaii, was the second of the four Jewel-class ships ordered by NCL to become an additional ship for NCL America. As the Pride of Hawaii proved unsuccessful in NCL America's fleet, it was decided that she would be transferred to NCL in 2008 and renamed Norwegian Jade.

The ships are 294 metres (964 ft 7 in) long and 32.2 metres (105 ft 8 in) wide, having 1,188 passenger cabins, with a capacity for 2,669 passengers.

== Concept and construction ==
The Jewel class was ordered in September 2003, with an option for two vessels. Later, the option was extended to four vessels. Jewel-class ships have Panamax dimensions, Azipod propulsors and tonnage values of 93,500 GT. The keel of the lead vessel, Norwegian Jewel was laid on 4 June 2004 and was delivered on 4 August 2005; the keel of second vessel, Norwegian Jade (former Pride of Hawaii) was laid on 8 February 2005 and was delivered on 19 April 2006; the third vessel's keel, Norwegian Pearl was laid on 4 October 2005 and was delivered on 28 November 2006; the last vessel's keel, Norwegian Gem was laid on 17 June 2006 and was delivered on 1 October 2007.

== Data ==
- Tonnage: 93,500-GT
- Length: 294 meters
- Width: 32.2 meters
- Decks: 15
- Builder: Meyer Werft
- Notes: Panamax form factor

== Ships ==
Ship	Built	Entered service for NCL	Last Refurbishment	Tonnage	Flag	Notes	Image
Norwegian Jewel	2005	2005	2018	93,502 tons	Bahamas		
Norwegian Jade	2006	2008	2017	93,558 tons	Bahamas	Originally named Pride of Hawaii until 2008.	
Norwegian Pearl	2006	2006	2017	93,530 tons	Bahamas		
Norwegian Gem	2007	2007	2015	93,530 tons	Bahamas		
