= Norwegian Dawn =

Cruise ship

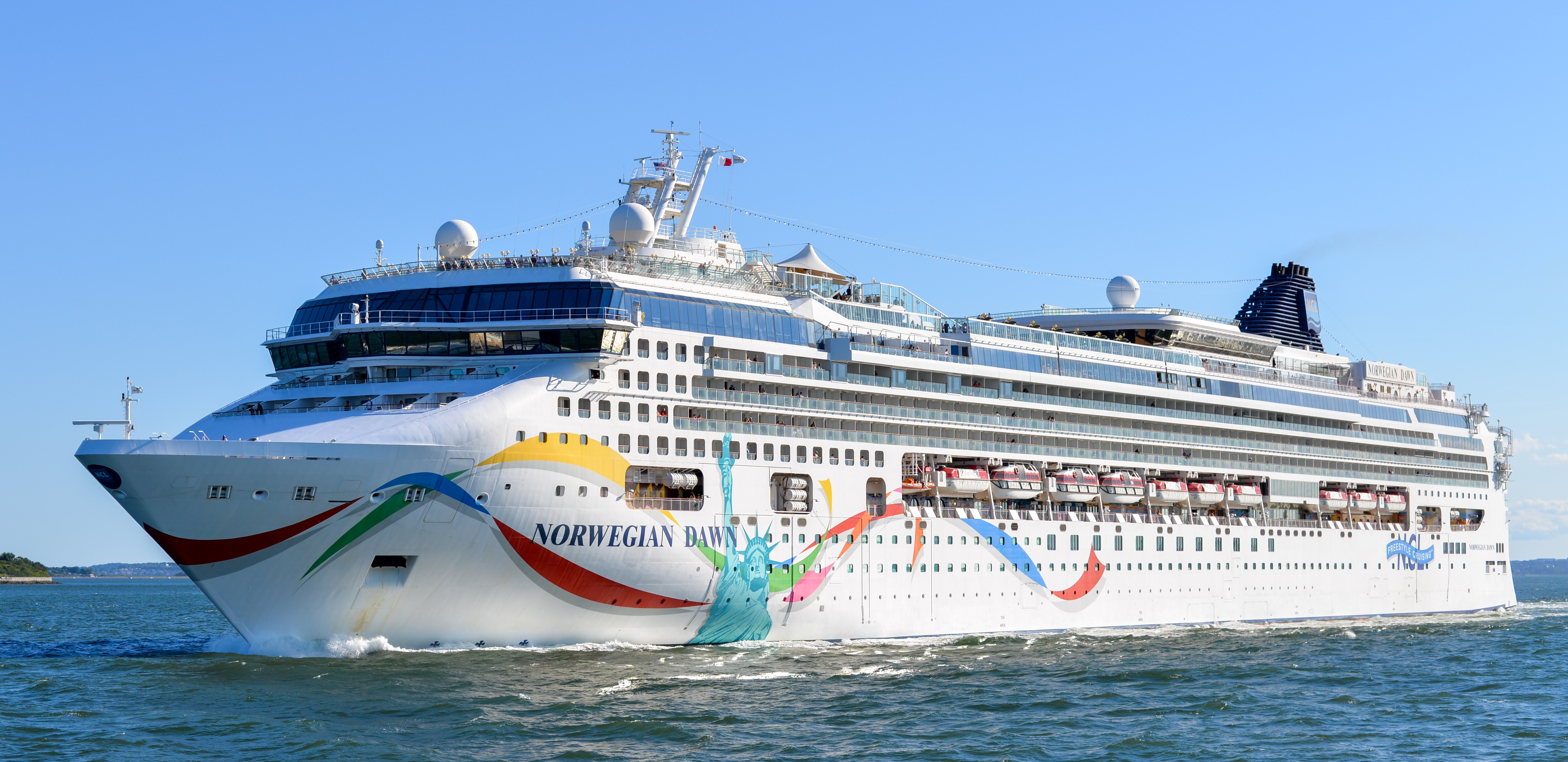
- Norwegian Dawn departing Boston Harbor, 2014

History

Bahamas
- Name: Superstar Scorpio (Construction Only); Norwegian Dawn (2002–present)
- Owner: Norwegian Cruise Line Holdings
- Operator: Norwegian Cruise Line
- Port of registry: Nassau, Bahamas
- Ordered: 9 March 1998
- Builder: Meyer Werft, Papenburg, Germany
- Cost: $450 million
- Yard number: 649
- Laid down: 29 June 1998
- Launched: 1 June 2002
- Sponsored by: Kim Cattrall
- Christened: 16 December 2002
- Completed: 3 December 2002
- Maiden voyage: 7 December 2002
- Identification: Call sign: C6FT7; IMO number: 9195169; MMSI number: 311307000
- Status: In service

General characteristics
- Class & type: Dawn-class cruise ship
- Tonnage: 92,250 GT; 61,406 NT; 7,500 DWT
- Length: 294 m (965 ft)
- Beam: 32.2 m (106 ft) (moulded); 38.1 m (125 ft) (max)
- Height: 59.5 m (195.2 ft)
- Draught: 8.5 m (27 ft 11 in)
- Depth: 11.5 m (38 ft)
- Decks: 15 decks
- Installed power: 4 × MAN B&W 14V48/60; 58,800 kW (combined)
- Propulsion: Two ABB Azipods (2 × 20 MW)
- Speed: 25 kn (46 km/h)
- Capacity: 2,340 passengers
- Crew: 1,032

Norwegian Dawn is a cruise ship that entered service in 2002 and is in operation with Norwegian Cruise Line.

== History ==
The ship was completed on 4 December 2002 at the Meyer Werft Shipyard in Papenburg, Germany and sailed her maiden voyage in Europe on 7 December 2002. She was intended to operate with Star Cruises under the name SuperStar Scorpio, but it was decided that she would be delivered to Star's subsidiary, Norwegian Cruise Line as Norwegian Dawn. Norwegian Dawn was christened 16 December 2002, in an elaborate ceremony in Manhattan by actress Kim Cattrall.

Norwegian Dawn was the first NCL vessel to carry hull art. Planned as a way to promote the vessel, the concept was well received and hull art was incorporated on most other NCL vessels, with the exception of those vessels scheduled to transition out of the fleet within the next few years.

== Incidents ==
On 16 April 2005, after sailing into rough weather off the coast of Georgia (U.S. state), Norwegian Dawn encountered a series of three 21-metre (70 ft) rogue waves. The third wave damaged several windows on the ninth and tenth decks and several decks were flooded. Damage, however, was not extensive and the ship was quickly repaired. Four passengers were slightly injured in this incident.

On 27 November 2009, Norwegian Dawn lost all power while returning to Miami. United States Coast Guard ships and helicopters were dispatched to the scene to assist. During the power outage, the more than 2,000 passengers on the ship had no access to running water, electricity, air conditioning or toilet services in the hot Caribbean environment. The temperatures in the area at the time were around 29 °C (85 °F) with 67% relative humidity. At least some power was restored and the ship was able to make port in San Juan, PR, not Miami as the itinerary dictated, to allow repairs to be made.

On 27 August 2010, Norwegian Dawn experienced engine problems. The ship had to leave Bermuda early to return to New York at a slower speed.

On 19 May 2015, Norwegian Dawn ran aground in Bermuda shortly after leaving port. The incident was attributed to a minor malfunction in the ship's steering, sending her off course to hit a sandbar. The ship was floated off the sandbar six hours later with the high tide, and allowed to continue to Boston after underwater surveys showed no damage.

On 9 December 2021, Norwegian Dawn was met with a large protest in Key West

In February 2024, the Mauritius government stopped the ship from docking in its ports. The ship had just arrived from nearby Reunion Island; where it had also been refused permission to dock. There was heavy media speculation that there were cases of cholera on board, but tests proved negative and on 26 February the vessel was granted permission to dock in Mauritius.

In March 2024, eight passengers were left behind in Santo António do Príncipe in São Tomé and Príncipe. The passengers took a private tour and failed to return to the ship before the last boarding call. The São Toméan Coast Guard attempted to bring the passengers to the ship, but for reasons that are unclear, they were refused boarding.

== Vessel class ==
Norwegian Dawn was the second in a line of two ships with this design, constructed at Meyer Werft Shipyard in Papenburg, Germany. Her sister ship is Norwegian Star, which entered service in November 2001. At the time of their order with Meyer Werft, these two ships were designated as Libra-class (Dawn-class in NCL publicity, as the Libra-class designation was because of its original assignment by Star Cruises until they were assigned to NCL operations). NCL continued using the same class designation for these ships.
