= Norwegian Jewel =

Cruise ship

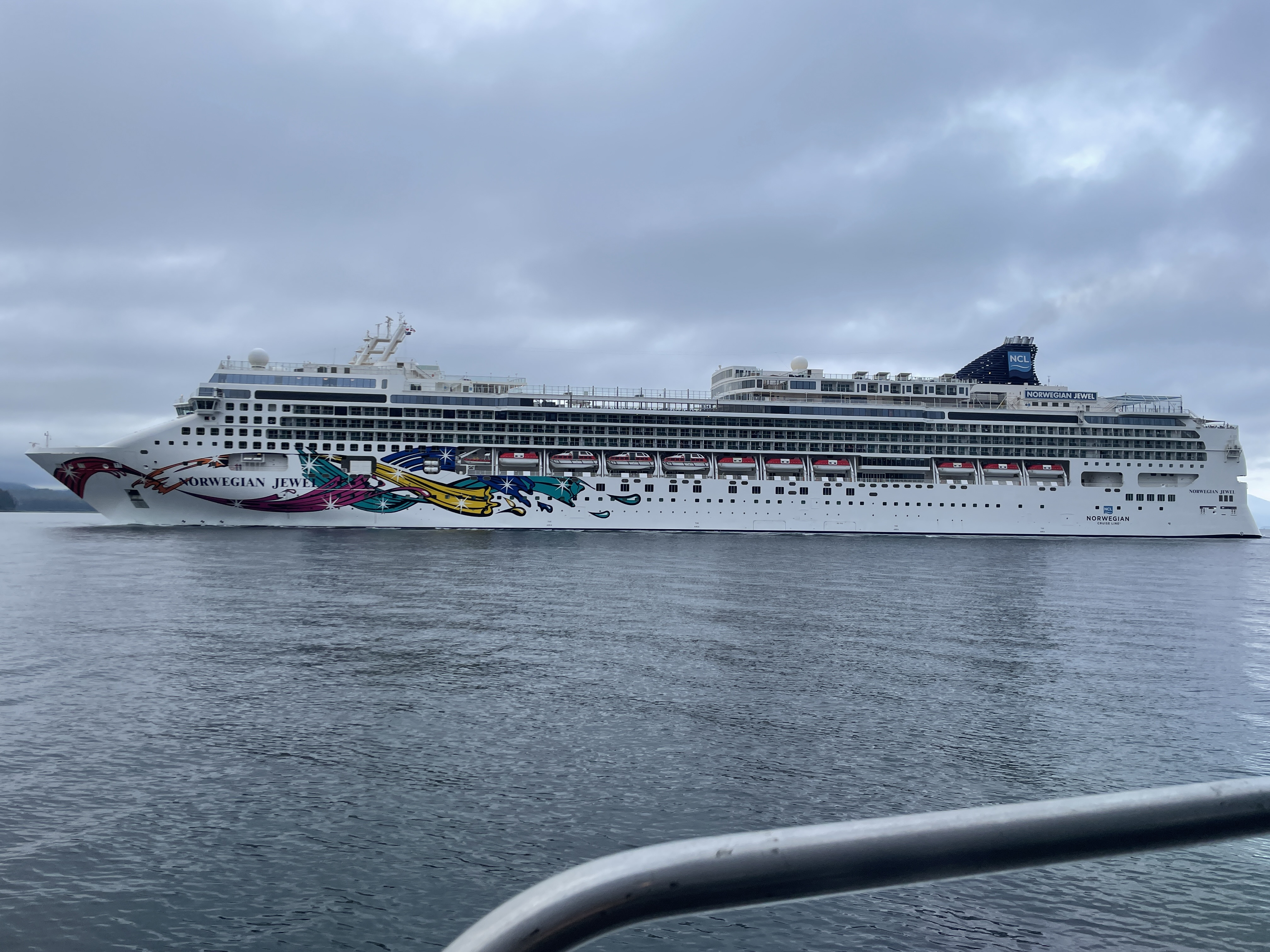
- Norwegian Jewel approaching Icy Strait Point, 2022

History

Bahamas
- Name: Norwegian Jewel
- Owner: Norwegian Cruise Line
- Port of registry: Nassau, Bahamas
- Builder: Meyer Werft; Papenburg, Germany
- Yard number: 667
- Laid down: 28 October 2003
- Launched: 12 June 2005
- Sponsored by: Melania Trump
- Christened: 3 November 2005
- Completed: 4 August 2005
- In service: 2005
- Identification: IMO number: 9304045; MMSI number: 311827000; Callsign: C6TX6
- Status: In service

General characteristics as built
- Class & type: Jewel-class cruise ship
- Tonnage: 93,502 GT; 7,500 DWT
- Length: 294.13 m (965 ft 0 in) oa; 263.5 m (864 ft 6 in) pp
- Beam: 32.2 m (105 ft 8 in)
- Height: 59.5 m (195.2 ft
- Draught: 8.6 m (28 ft 3 in)
- Decks: 15
- Installed power: 5 × MAN-B&W 12V48/60B
- Propulsion: 2 × Azipod thrusters
- Speed: 25.6 knots (47.4 km/h; 29.5 mph)
- Capacity: 2,376 passengers
- Crew: 1,100

Norwegian Jewel is a cruise ship operated by Norwegian Cruise Line (NCL). She is the lead vessel of NCL's Jewel-class cruise ships and entered service in 2005. The vessel sails primarily in the western Pacific Ocean.

== Design and description ==
Norwegian Jewel is NCL's first of four Jewel-class ships. The vessel has a gross tonnage (GT) of 93,502 and measures 7,500 DWT. The cruise ship is 294.13 metres (965 ft 0 in) long overall and 63.5 m (208 ft 4 in) between perpendiculars with a beam of 32.2 m (105 ft 8 in) and a draught of 8.6 m (28 ft 3 in).

Norwegian Jewel is powered by a diesel-electric propulsion system comprising five MAN-B&W 12V48/60B diesel engines providing power to two Azipod thrusters. The system is variably rated at 75,000 kilowatts (100,000 hp), and 39,000 kW (52,000 hp). This gives the cruise ship a maximum speed of 25.6 knots (47.4 km/h; 29.5 mph). (Note: The Miramar Ship Index gives the maximum speed as 24.5 knots (45.4 km/h; 28.2 mph))

The ship had a capacity for 2,376 passengers as built with a crew of 1,100. This later grew to 2,394 passengers with a crew of 1,072. (Note: According to the official Norwegian Cruise Line's Norwegian Jewel site, the vessel has capacity for 2,376 passengers and a crew of 1,069.) There are 1,197 cabins aboard, ranging in size from 13.2–407.8 square metres (142–4,390 sq ft) of which 540 have a balcony. The vessel has 13 bars and lounges, 10 restaurants and a 1,037-seat theatre. (Note: According to the official website, there are 15 bars and lounges.)

== Construction and career ==
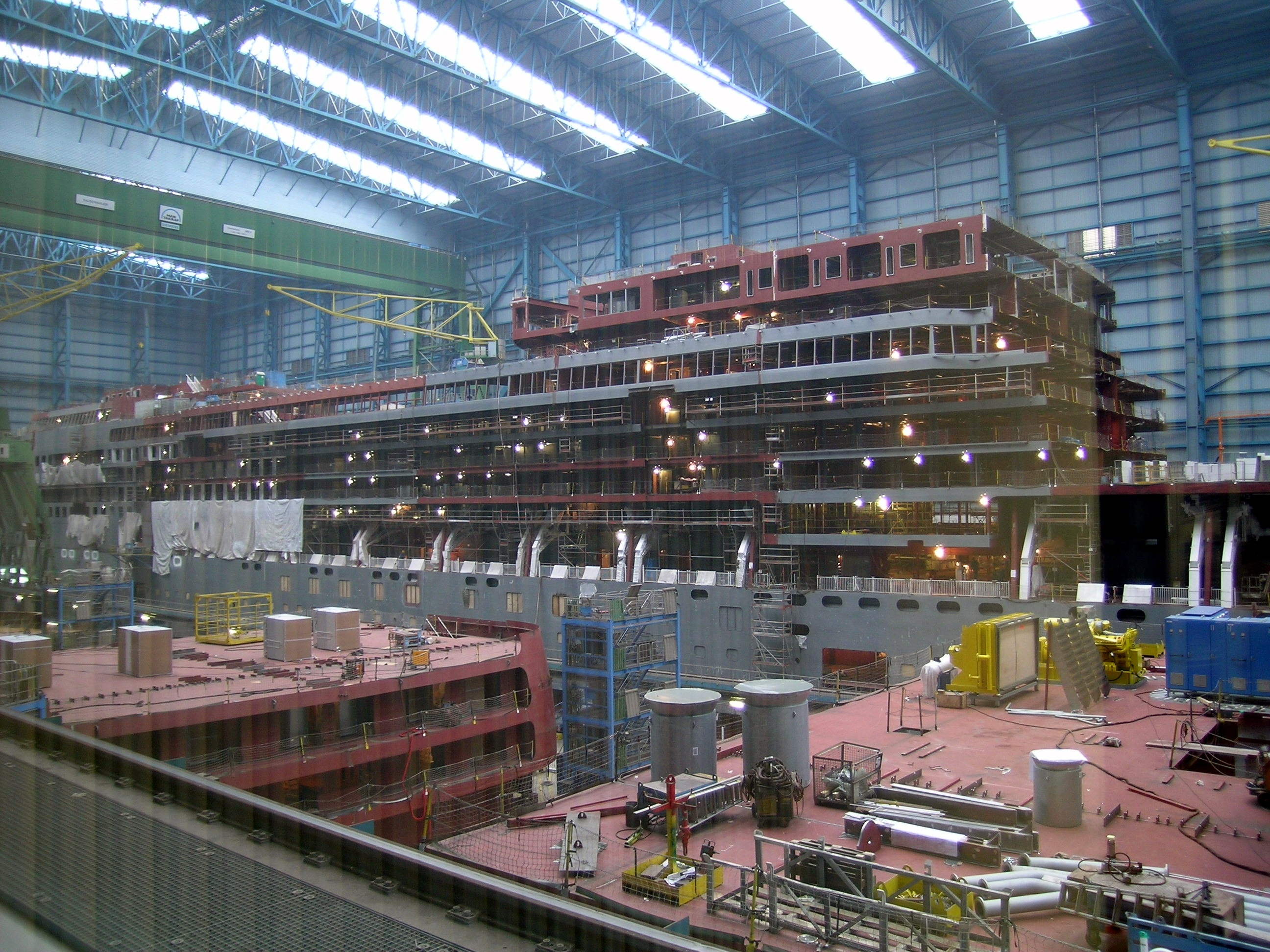
Norwegian Jewel under construction at Meyer Werft's shipyard in 2004

The cruise ship was ordered by NCL on 15 September 2003 constructed at the Meyer Werft Shipyard in Papenburg, Germany with the yard number 667. The keel laying ceremony took place on 28 October 2003. (Note: The Miramar Ship Index has the keel being laid on 4 June 2004.) The vessel was launched on 12 June 2005, left the shipyard on 25 June and was completed on 4 August 2005. The ship was formally named Norwegian Jewel on 3 November 2005 in a ceremony at the Port of Miami, United States. Her godmother is Melania Trump, wife of business magnate Donald Trump and later the First Lady of the United States from 2017 through 2021, and from 2025 through 2029. Norwegian Jewel was registered in the Bahamas on 1 August 2005 and entered service in December of that year.

In an episode of The Apprentice, Donald Trump required his contestants to create a 30-second commercial of the ship, featuring both exterior and interior shots.

Norwegian Jewel underwent a dry dock refurbishment at Sembawang Shipyard in Singapore from 22 October to 5 November 2018. Norwegian Jewel was scheduled to spend the southern summer 2019–2020 undertaking cruises in Australia, New Zealand, Asia, and the South Pacific.

°=== Coronavirus quarantine ===

The cruise ship was stranded in the middle of the Pacific Ocean in 2020, after being denied entry into Papeete, French Polynesia and Lautoka, Fiji, due to fears of possible infection. On 19 March the 1,700 passengers were prevented from disembarking in Honolulu, Hawaii.

On 23 March, the passengers were allowed to disembark in Honolulu because the ship was experiencing mechanical problems. Passengers were able to catch chartered flights to return to their home locations. There were no confirmed cases of COVID-19 aboard the ship. The approximately 1,000 crew members were remaining on the ship as of 27 March. On 10 April, 42 Filipino crew members arrived in Manila.

== Notable events ==
Since 2025, the ship has hosted the annual Chris Jericho's Rock 'N' Wrestling Rager at Sea, a music festival and professional wrestling cruise with live performances from various artists, stand-up comedy, meet and greets with various celebrity guests, and live professional wrestling matches. On November 7, 2026, the ship hosted a live episode of All Elite Wrestling's Collision weekly television show.
