= The Choir of Man =

Theatrical production

- West End Promotional Poster
- Music: Various Artists
- Lyrics: Various Artists
- Book: Nic Doodson, Andrew Kay
- Premiere: August 2017: Edinburgh Fringe

The Choir of Man is a British musical created by Nic Doodson and Andrew Kay. Set in a traditional British or Irish pub, the show features a working on-stage bar from which pints of beer are poured for the audience during the performance. Throughout the show, the cast of nine multi-instrumentalist singers perform arrangements of well known pop and rock songs arranged and orchestrated by the show's musical supervisor Jack Blume, while dialogue takes the form of spoken word monologues written by performance poet Ben Norris. The movement direction and choreography is by tap dancer Freddie Huddleston.

The show was first presented at the Edinburgh Fringe Festival in 2017, and has since had seasons at venues around the world, including the Sydney Opera House and the John F. Kennedy Center for the Performing Arts.

Since 2018, The Choir of Man has been a resident show on board the Norwegian Escape and Norwegian Encore cruise ships.

== Background ==
After working together since 2014 on the production of A Cappella music stage show Gobsmacked!, in 2016 Nic Doodson and Andrew Kay came up with the idea for a show about 'normal men', who sing in their local pub's choir. Having co-created Gobsmacked! with Doodson, Jack Blume was brought on board as the show's musical arranger. Soon afterwards Freddie Huddleston, who had previously worked with Blume on a workshop project, joined the creative team as the choreographer and movement director. The show's premiere season was at the 2017 Edinburgh Festival Fringe, in the Assembly Rooms Music Hall on Princes Street. The original cast included actor and poetry slam champion Ben Norris. During development workshops for the show, Doodson asked Norris to write some poetic monologues to help transition between songs. These segments became a defining part of the show's tone and character, and were gradually woven throughout the production.

== Production history ==
=== Edinburgh Fringe Festival (2017) ===
The premiere season of The Choir of Man was at the Assembly Music Hall in August 2017. The original cast included John Sheehy, Aidan Banyard, Mark Loveday, Tom Brandon, Jami Reid-Quarrell, Ben Norris, Freddie Huddleston, Peter Lawrence and Andrew Carter. This version did not include the role of a virtuoso pianist.

=== Adelaide Fringe Festival (2018) ===
Taking place at the Adelaide Fringe Festival's Gluttony site in the Flamingo tent, The Choir of Man's second outing had a few changes of repertoire, new monologues, and with the addition of Connor Going to the cast, was the debut of the virtuoso pianist role. In Week 2 of the festival, the show won the BankSA "Best Music" award. At the end of the season, it won the Bank SA overall "Pick of the Fringe" award.

Post-COVID-19 Cleveland Residency (2021)

Choir of Man was the first musical to perform in the U.S. after the COVID-19 shutdown. The production began in June of 2021 and was extended through September of 2021 reopening Playhouse Square, Cleveland, the largest theatre district outside of New York.

=== West End (2021-2025) ===
The Choir of Man made its West End debut at the Arts Theatre on 29 October 2021, with the run later extended due to popular demand. After receiving a nomination for the Olivier Award for Best Entertainment or Comedy Play in 2022, the show announced it would be returning to the Arts Theatre in October 2022.

The show closed on 31 December 2024 due to planned renovations to the Arts Theatre shortly after.

With the reopening of the Arts Theatre, The Choir of Man has returned to the West End, having their opening night on 12th March 2025. The current cast includes: Jason Brock as ‘Romantic’, Benji Lord as ‘Joker’, David Booth as ‘Pub Bore’, Paul McArthur as ‘Poet’, Oliver Jacobson as ‘Barman’, and Alex Mallalieu and Toby Francis as swings. They join pub regulars Rob Godfrey as ‘Beast’, Ifan Gwilym-Jones as ‘Maestro’, and George Knapper as ‘Handyman’, with Bradley Walwyn as ‘Hardman’. David Shute and Tom Carter-Miles both return as swings.

On 30 September 2025, it was announced that the production would close on 4 January 2026, and two days later, on 2 October 2025, it was announced that the show would embark on a 38-week UK tour beginning 14 March 2026

Role	Original West End Cast
Romantic	Miles Daley
Joker	Daniel Harnett
Barman	Mark Loveday
Hardman	Tom Brandon
Maestro	Ali Higgins
Handyman	Freddie Huddlestone
Poet	Ben Norris
Beast	Dickie Locke
Bore	Tyler Orphe-Baker

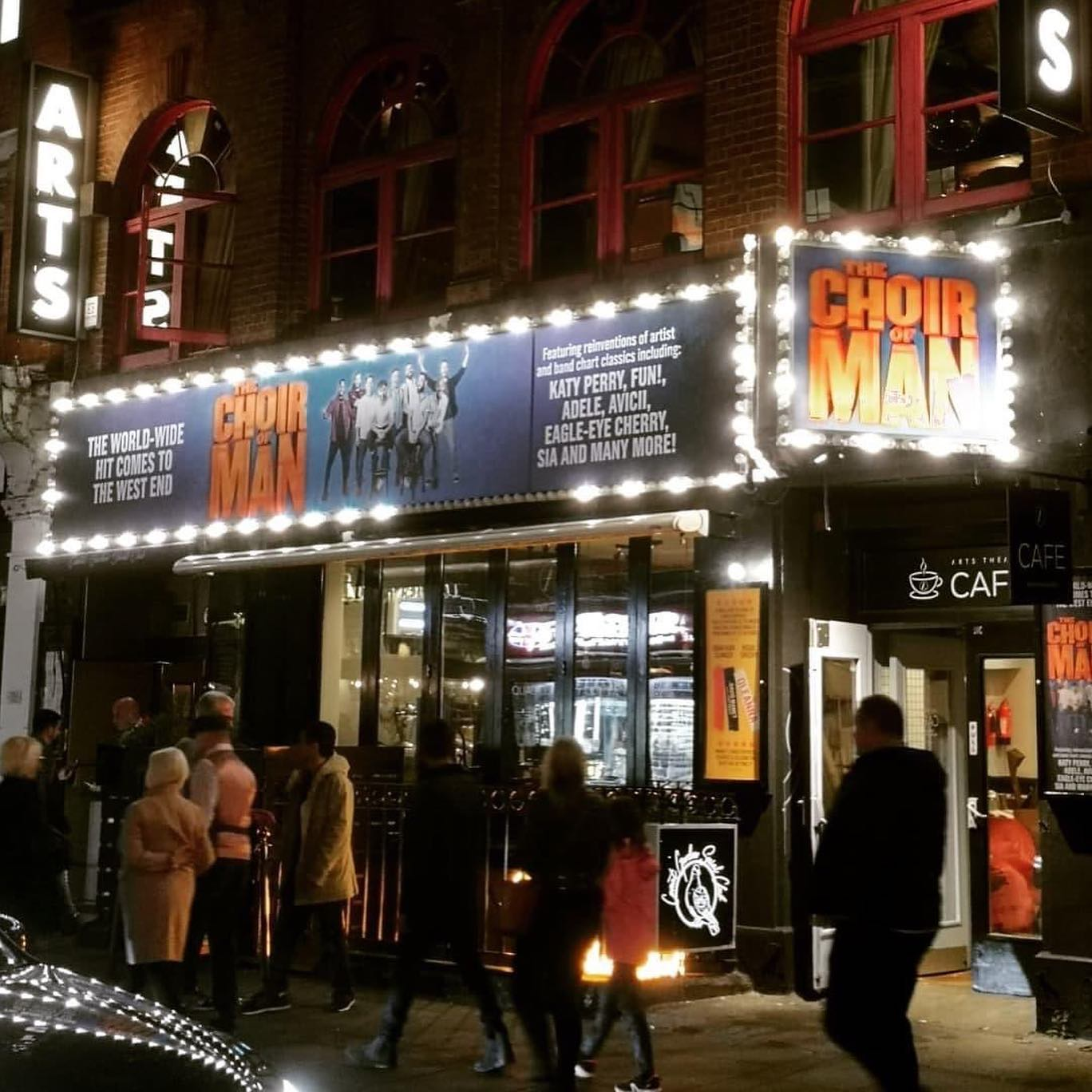
The Choir of Man at the Arts Theatre, West End 2021

== Norwegian Cruise Lines ==
After its success at the 2017 Edinburgh Fringe Festival, The Choir of Man was licensed for performance at sea by Norwegian Cruise Line, making its debut on the Norwegian Escape in 2018, and subsequently opening on board the brand new Norwegian Encore in 2019. During the COVID-19 pandemic whilst theatres and cruise lines around the world were shut down, the show's cast filmed a special "Live From London" performance in the empty Garrick Theatre, for NCL's EMBARK series. This hour long special featured interviews with cast members cut into a socially-distanced concert performance of songs from the show, performed on the empty Garrick stage.

== Music ==
The show features a combination of acoustic and folk covers to well known rock and pop hits, as well as one original song.

1. "Welcome to the Jungle"
2. "Save Tonight"/"Wake Me Up"
3. "Teenage Dream"
4. "The Impossible Dream"
5. "50 Ways to Leave Your Lover"
6. "Hello"
7. "Escape (The Piña Colada Song)"
8. "I'm Gonna Be (500 Miles)"
9. "Under the Bridge"
10. "Chandelier"
11. "Bring Tomorrow On" *
12. "Dance with My Father"
13. "Somebody to Love"
14. "You're the Voice"
15. "Some Nights"
16. "The Parting Glass"

*Notes original song
