= Ben Norris =

Ben Norris may refer to:

- Ben Norris (artist), (1910–2006), American modernist painter
- Ben Norris (actor), British playwright and actor
- Ben Norris (comedian), British stand-up comic
