= Norwegian Encore =

Ship of Norwegian Cruise Line (NCL)

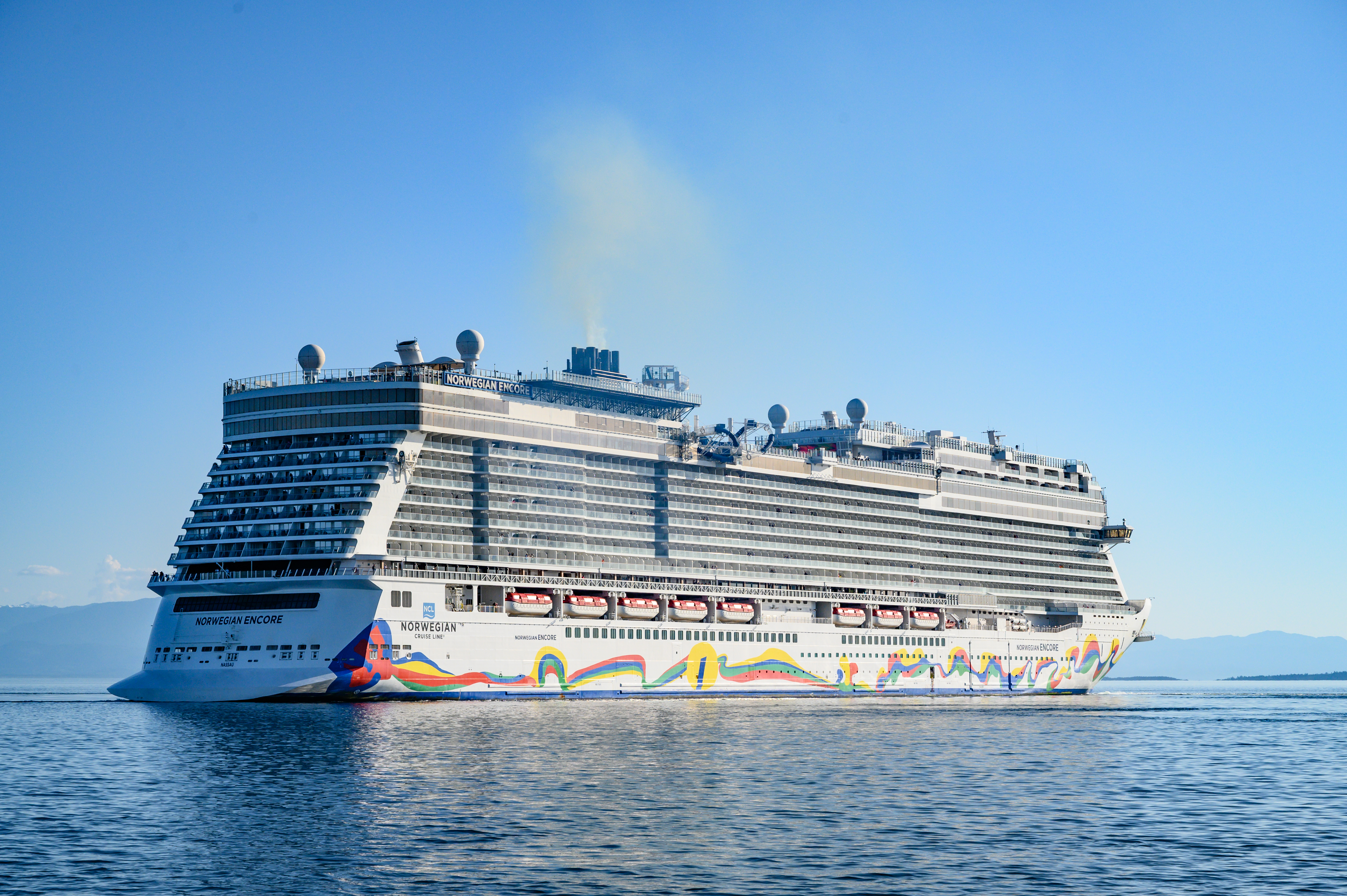
- Norwegian Encore off Ogden Point, BC Canada

History

Bahamas
- Name: Norwegian Encore
- Owner: Norwegian Cruise Line Holdings
- Operator: Norwegian Cruise Line
- Port of registry: Nassau, Bahamas
- Ordered: 14 July 2014
- Builder: Meyer Werft; Papenburg, Germany
- Cost: US$1 billion
- Yard number: S.708
- Laid down: 28 November 2018
- Launched: 17 August 2019
- Sponsored by: Kelly Clarkson
- Christened: 21 November 2019
- Completed: 30 October 2019
- Acquired: 30 October 2019
- Maiden voyage: 2 November 2019
- In service: 2019–present
- Identification: IMO number: 9751511; MMSI number: 311000879; Callsign: C6EF4
- Status: In Service

General characteristics
- Class & type: Breakaway Plus-class cruise ship
- Tonnage: 169,116 GT; 11,700 DWT
- Length: 333.44 m (1,094.0 ft)
- Beam: 48.13 m (157.9 ft) (max); 41.36 m (135.7 ft) (waterline)
- Height: 217 ft (66 m)
- Draught: 8.7 m (29 ft)
- Depth: 11.6 m (38 ft)
- Decks: 16 passenger decks; 20 total decks
- Installed power: 2 × MAN B&W 14V48/60CR; 3 × MAN B&W 12V48/60CR; Total Installed Power: 76,800 kW (103,000 hp)
- Speed: 22.5 knots (42 km/h) (cruising)
- Capacity: 3,998 lower beds
- Crew: 2,100
- Notes: Hull art designed by Eduardo Arranz-Bravo

Norwegian Encore is a Breakaway Plus-class cruise ship operated by Norwegian Cruise Line (NCL). She is the fourth Breakaway Plus-class ship in the fleet, following sister ships Norwegian Bliss, Norwegian Escape and Norwegian Joy, and was commissioned in November 2019.

== History ==
=== Construction and delivery ===
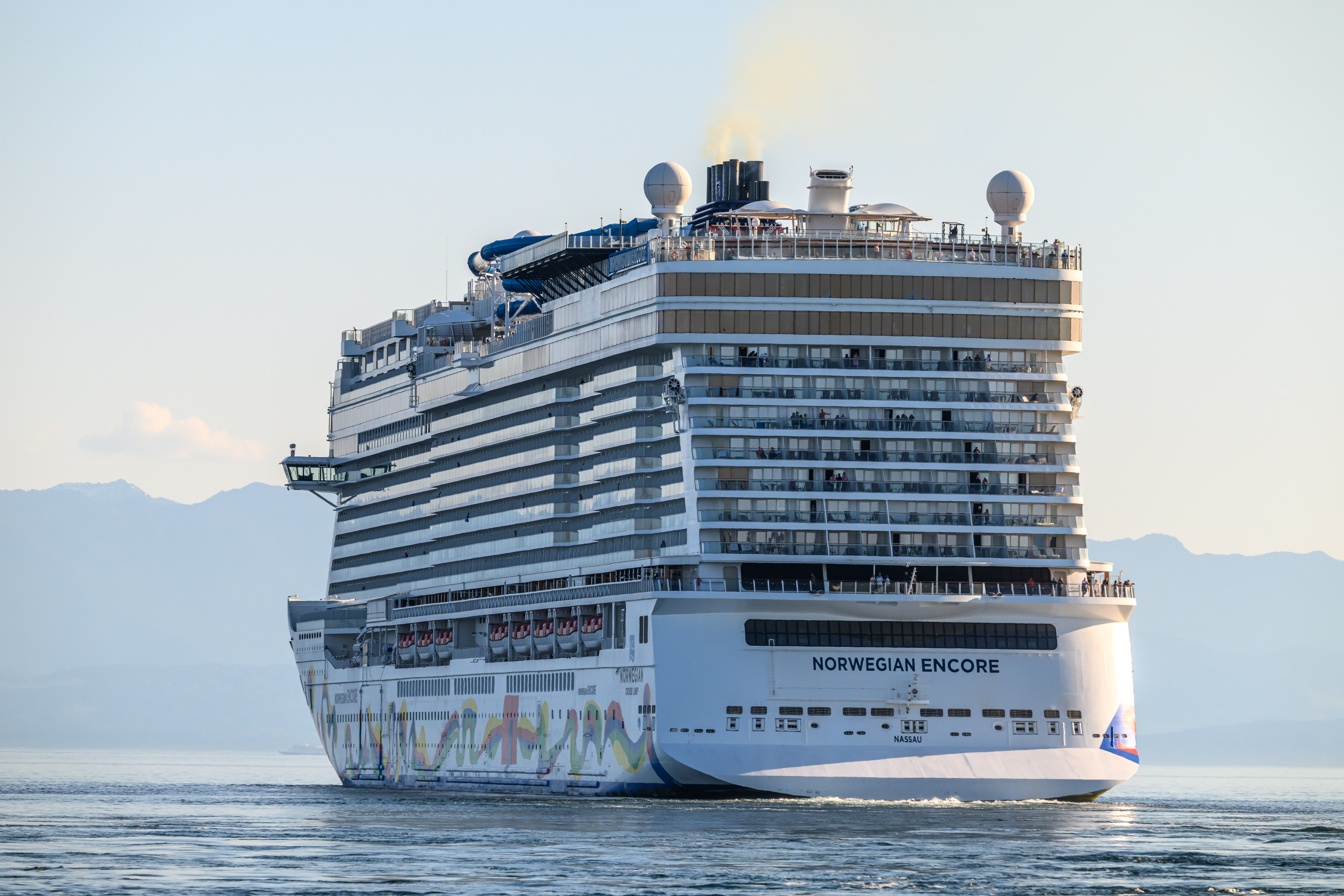
Norwegian Encore off Ogden Point BC Canada

==== Planning and construction ====
On 14 July 2014, NCL announced that it had reached an agreement with Meyer Werft for a €1.6 billion order of two new Breakaway Plus-class ships, scheduled for delivery in 2018 and 2019, respectively. Each ship was initially estimated to be approximately 164,600 GT and have 4,200 passenger berths.

In February 2017, it was announced that the ship scheduled for delivery in 2019 would be designed for the Chinese market, much like her sister ship, Norwegian Joy. However, in January 2018, it was later announced that the ship would instead be designed for the Western market like her other sister ship, Norwegian Bliss.

Construction started with the ship's steel cutting on 31 January 2018, the day her name was also announced as Norwegian Encore. Her keel-laying ceremony was performed on 28 November 2018, accompanied by a performance from the musical Kinky Boots.

Norwegian Encore's float-out was on 17 August 2019 and the ship was towed from the building dock to receive her funnel cladding and further outfitting. The ship began her scheduled conveyance along the Ems towards the Eemshaven for her sea trials on 30 September 2019 and completed it on 1 October.

==== Delivery and christening ====
Norwegian Encore was delivered to NCL on 30 October 2019 in Bremerhaven. The ship was the 15th and last ship that Meyer Werft has built for NCL.

Andy Stuart, then-president and CEO of NCL, announced on The Kelly Clarkson Show on 10 September 2019 that Kelly Clarkson would be the godmother to Norwegian Encore. Clarkson performed at the christening ceremony and officially named the vessel on 21 November 2019 in Miami prior to the ship's debut in the Caribbean on 24 November.

=== Deployments and operational career ===
For her inaugural season, Norwegian Encore held different preview events in Europe, with a preview cruise from Bremerhaven to Southampton, before her inaugural voyage, an 8-day transatlantic sailing between Southampton and New York. The ship held different preview events in New York and Miami upon her arrival in North America, prior to her christening and debut. Following her debut in Miami, her deployment covered the Eastern Caribbean through the rest of her inaugural season.

Norwegian Encore was scheduled to homeport in New York in summer 2020 to sail to Bermuda, the Maritimes, and New England, before moving back to Miami in winter 2020 to cruise the Western Caribbean. In spring 2021, she was expected to make her first full Panama Canal transit to be deployed to Seattle for her first summer Alaska season.

However, in March 2020, at the start of the COVID-19 pandemic, NCL suspended all sailings. After the last passengers had disembarked from Norwegian Encore following this suspension, it was reported that several crew members had become sick and one who had already disembarked was later diagnosed with the coronavirus. By early October 2020, the Norwegian Encore was reported at anchor in Weymouth Bay, off the south coast of England. On 18 October, she arrived in Southampton, where she docked alongside the City Cruise Terminal.

== Design and specifications ==
Norwegian Encore has an overall length of 333.5 m (1,094 ft), moulded beam 41.50 m (136.2 ft) and maximum draft 9.00 m (29.53 ft). The ship has gross tonnage of 169,116 GT and deadweight of 11,700 DWT. Norwegian Encore has 20 decks, 2,043 staterooms and capacity for 4,004 passengers at double occupancy.

Norwegian Encore has five main engines with total output power of 102,900 hp (76.7 MW). The vessel has two MAN B&W 14V48/60CR, each with power of 22,520 hp (16.79 MW) and three MAN B&W 12V48/60CR, each with power of 19,300 hp (14.4 MW). The propulsion system is two ABB Azipod XO units with total power of 40 MW, which allows service speed of 22.5 kts, while the maximum speed during trials exceeds 25.0 kts. The engines are equipped with scrubbers and a heat recovery system for improved energy efficiency.
