= Norwegian Bliss =

Cruise ship

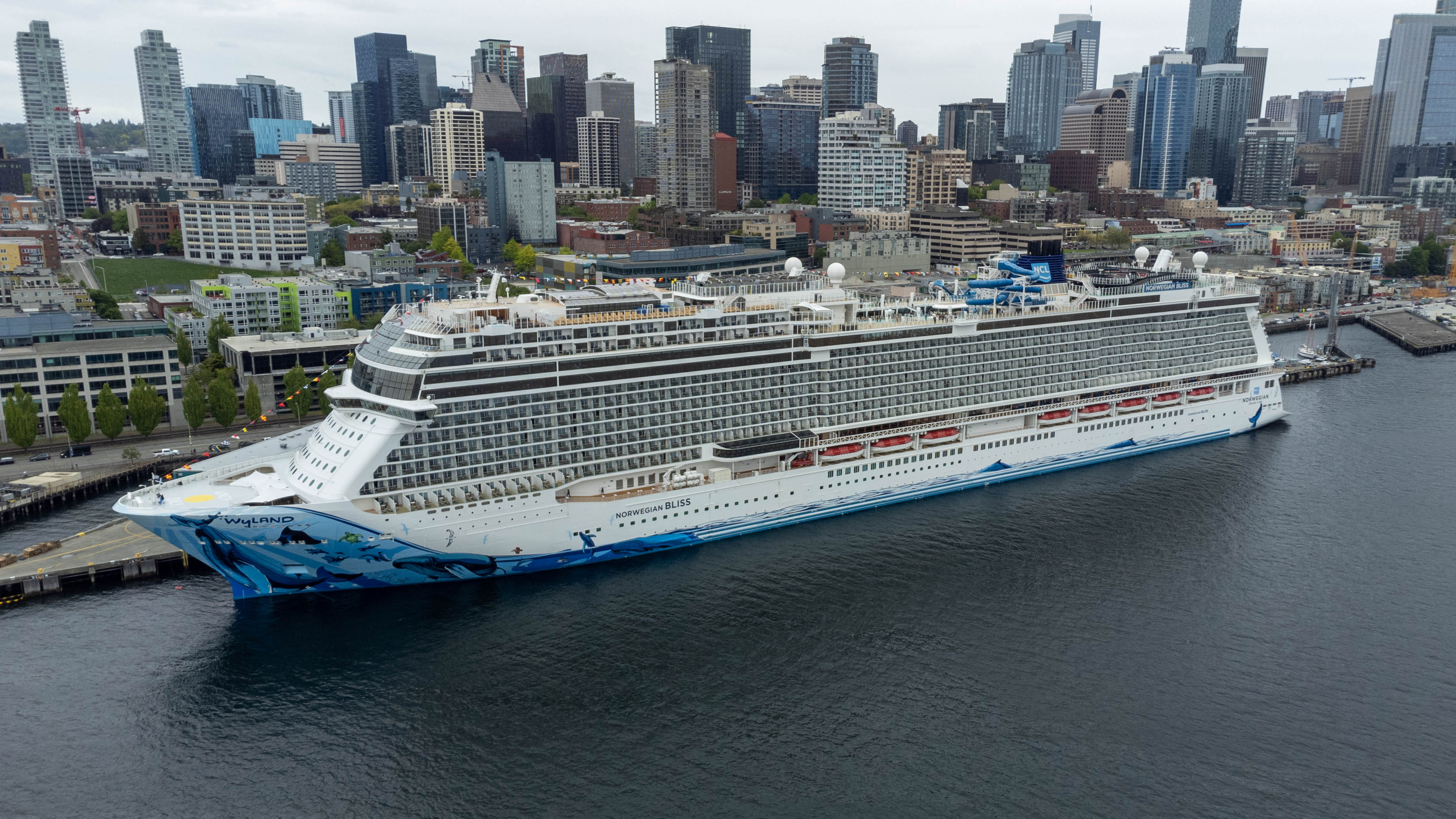
- Norwegian Bliss in Seattle, 2022

History

Bahamas
- Name: Norwegian Bliss
- Owner: Norwegian Cruise Line Holdings
- Operator: Norwegian Cruise Line
- Port of registry: Nassau, Bahamas
- Ordered: July 2014
- Builder: Meyer Werft, Papenburg, Germany
- Yard number: S.707
- Launched: 17 February 2018
- Sponsored by: Elvis Duran
- Christened: 30 May 2018
- Completed: 15 March 2018
- Acquired: 21 April 2018
- Maiden voyage: 2 June 2018
- In service: 21 April 2018 (including positioning voyages)
- Identification: IMO number: 9751509; MMSI number: 311000710; Callsign: C6DL4
- Status: In service

General characteristics
- Class & type: Breakaway Plus-class cruise ship
- Tonnage: 168,028 GT; 11,700 DWT
- Length: 1,094 ft (333 m)
- Beam: 136 ft (41 m)
- Height: 217 ft (66 m)
- Draught: 28.5 ft (8.70 m)
- Decks: 20
- Installed power: 2 × MAN B&W 14V48/60CR; 3 × MAN B&W 12V48/60CR
- Speed: 22.5 knots (41.7 km/h; 25.9 mph) (cruising)
- Capacity: 4,002 passengers (at Double Occupancy)
- Crew: 1,700
- Notes: Hull art designed by Wyland

Norwegian Bliss is a cruise ship for Norwegian Cruise Line, which entered service on 21 April 2018. The ship was built by Meyer Werft in Papenburg, Germany. The ship had a schedule of debuting in Alaska, United States in June 2018, and is designed for improved energy efficiency to meet Alaska's environmental regulations.

== History ==
Norwegian Cruise Line placed an order for a third Breakaway Plus cruise ship in July 2014. Construction started with steel cutting on 28 October 2016. Norwegian Bliss is the sister ship to Norwegian Escape, Norwegian Joy, and Norwegian Encore.

On 29 November 2017, nationally syndicated radio and digital personality Elvis Duran was announced as her sponsor. Duran hosts the morning talk radio show, Elvis Duran and the Morning Show. On-air, Duran also made the entire morning show (along with himself) "godparents" of the ship. Duran is the third godfather to any Norwegian vessel, only behind Pitbull and Wang Leehom, who sponsored sister ships Norwegian Escape and Norwegian Joy.

Norwegian Bliss' float-out was on 17 February 2018. The ship was towed from the building dock and berth at the outfitting pier to get her funnel.

The ship was delivered to NCL on 21 April 2018 when the CEO of NCL, Andy Stuart, signed the ship documents where Norwegian Cruise Lines Holdings Limited took possession of the ship and started her inaugural voyage later on in the day. She reached North America, approaching New York in the overnight hours of 3 May 2018. The next day, a remote broadcast of Elvis Duran and his morning show took place. While sailing to Seattle, Washington from New York, Norwegian Bliss passed through the Panama Canal and became the largest cruise ship to ever transit it. This was not surpassed until 2026, by the Disney Adventure. The ship arrived in Seattle on 30 May 2018, and was officially christened later that same day.

== Design ==
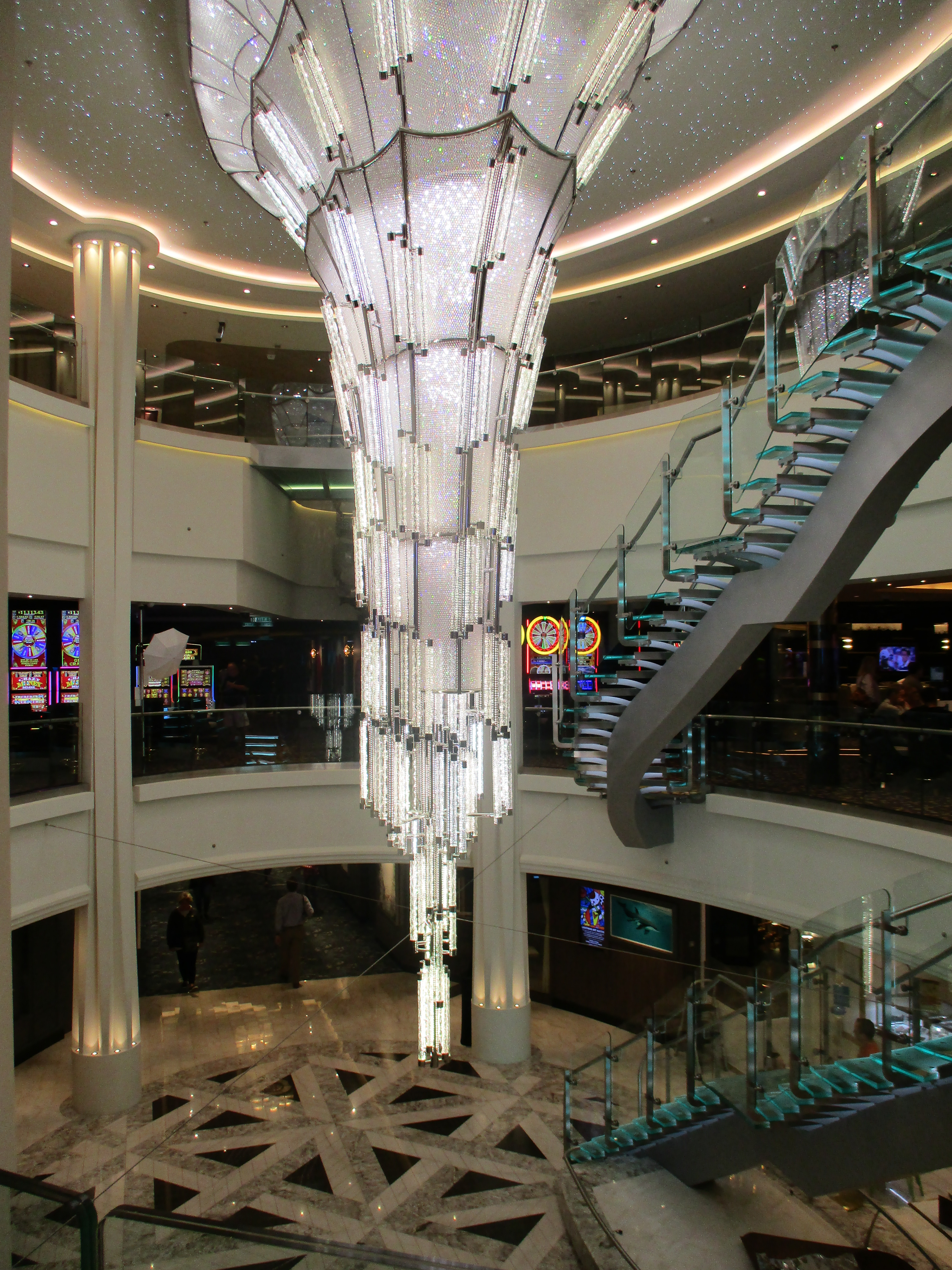
Norwegian Bliss interior

Norwegian Bliss has an overall length of 333.5 m (1,094 ft 2 in), moulded beam 41.50 m (136 ft 2 in), and maximum draft 9.00 m (29 ft 6 in). The ship has gross tonnage of 168,028 GT and deadweight of 11,700 DWT. Norwegian Bliss has 20 decks and 2,220 cabins, and can carry 4,000 passengers.

The hull art for Norwegian Bliss was designed by marine wildlife artist Wyland. Wyland is best known for his "Whaling Wall" murals, in which he painted life-sized whales on 100 buildings all over the world.

Norwegian Bliss sailed on her inaugural cruise on 21 April 2018. Norwegian Bliss sailed on Mexican Riviera cruises from Los Angeles, California and cruises from Miami, Florida for her 2018 winter/spring season. For her 2019–2020 winter season, Norwegian Bliss sailed out from Manhattan, New York replacing her sister ship, Norwegian Escape, which moved back to Miami. Norwegian Bliss will sail to the Bahamas and eastern Florida, as well as longer cruises to the Caribbean, before repositioning to Seattle to resume cruising around Alaska in the summer of 2020.

Norwegian Bliss has five main engines with total output power of 102,900 horsepower (76,700 kW). The vessel has two MAN B&W 14V48/60CR, each with power of 22,520 hp (16,790 kW) and three MAN B&W 12V48/60CR, each with power of 19,300 hp (14,400 kW). The propulsion system is two ABB Azipod XO units with total power of 40 MW, which allows service speed of 22.5 knots (41.7 km/h; 25.9 mph), while the maximum speed during trials exceeds 25.0 knots (46.3 km/h; 28.8 mph). The engines are equipped with scrubbers and a heat recovery systems for improved energy efficiency.

== Ship amenities ==
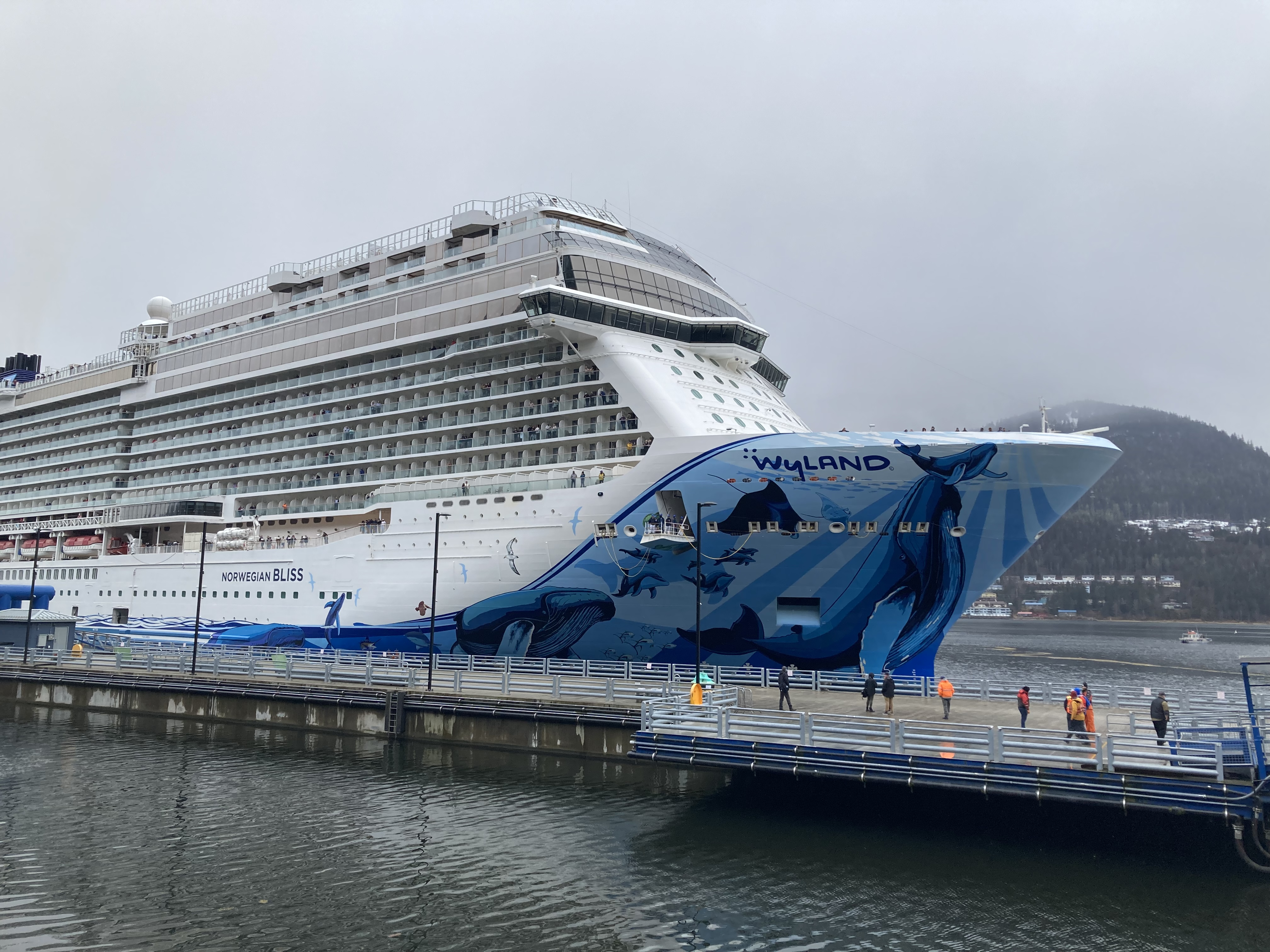
Norwegian Bliss docking in Juneau, Alaska, on April 17, 2023

Norwegian Bliss has various themed dining areas and bars. The Tony Award-winning musical Jersey Boys and Icons currently play in repertory on the ship. The Bliss and the Encore each have an electric go-kart track.

=== Route ===
Following the christening, she sailed Alaska cruises with the first departure occurring on 2 June 2018, then at New York. On 24 October 2018, on a Diverted Baja Peninsular (Originally Mexican Rivera) cruise, she visited San Diego for the first time. Upon docking, she became the largest ship to dock at the port's facilities in terms of passenger capacity and length, superseding the 2013 docking of Celebrity Solstice. The vessel began sailing in November 2018 from Miami.
