= Breakaway-class cruise ship =

Class of cruise ships

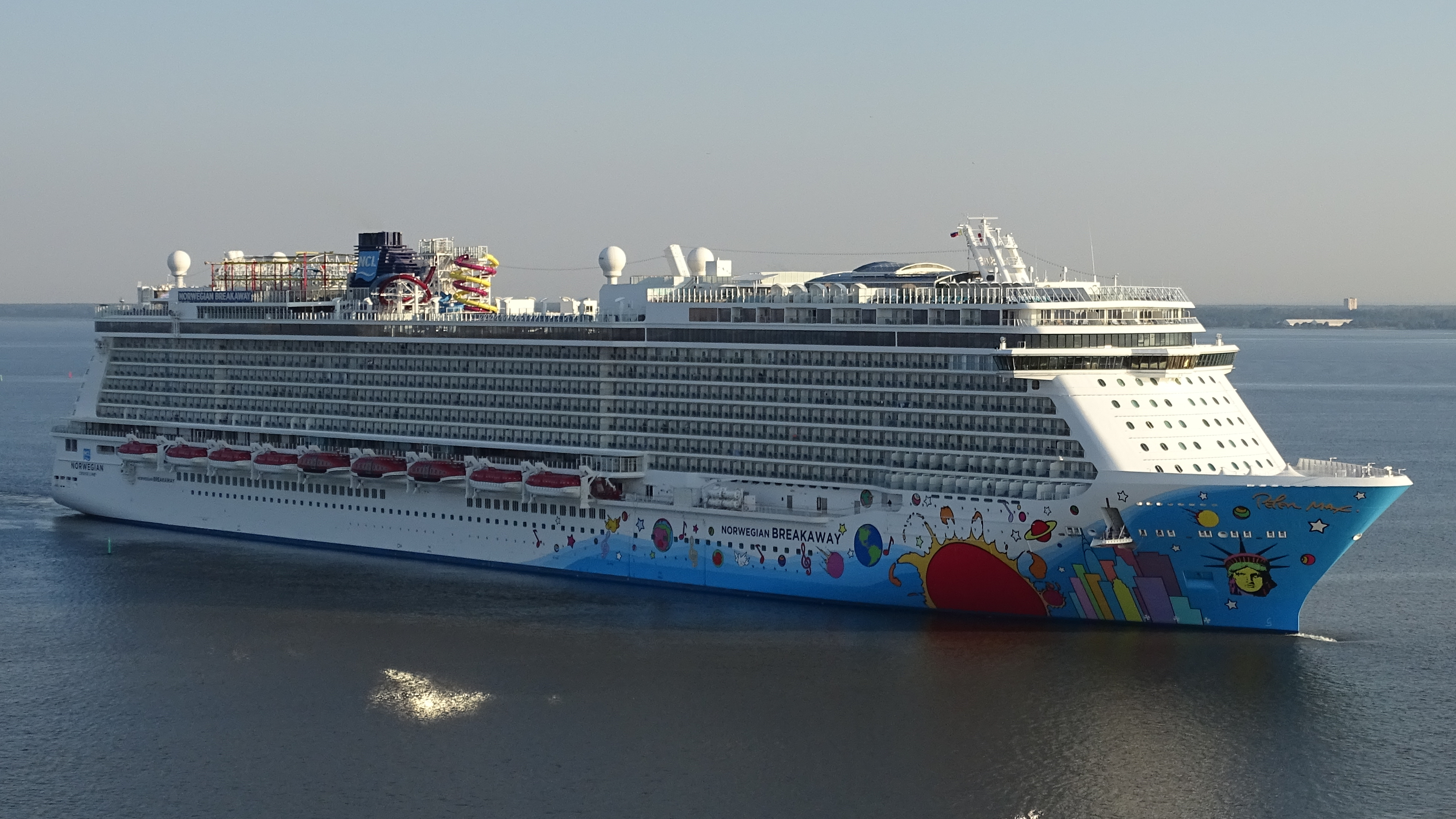
- Norwegian Breakaway

Class overview
- Builders: Meyer Werft
- Operators: Norwegian Cruise Line (2015–present); Dream Cruises (2016–2022, 2025–present); Resorts World Cruises (2022–2025); Aroya Cruises (2022–present)
- Preceded by: Epic class
- Succeeded by: Norwegian Cruise Line: Prima class; Dream Cruises: Global class
- Subclasses: Breakaway-plus class; Genting class
- Built: 2013–2019
- Planned: 8
- Completed: 8
- Active: 8
- Laid up: 1

General characteristics
- Type: Cruise ship
- Tonnage: 145,655 –169,116 GT
- Length: 1,068–1,100 ft (326–335 m)
- Beam: 169 ft (52 m)
- Height: 61 m (200 ft) – 66 m (217 ft)
- Decks: 18–20
- Speed: 21 knots (39 km/h; 24 mph)
- Capacity: 3,352 – 4,002 passengers
- Crew: 1,657 – 1,999

The Breakaway class is a class of cruise ships owned and operated by Norwegian Cruise Line, Dream Cruises and Cruise Saudi (Aroya Cruises). This class is an original design, and has two sub-classes. Although most ships of the class have subtle changes between one another, they all have the same general design. The first ship of the class, Norwegian Breakaway, launched in 2013.

== Ships ==
Ship	Year ordered	In service	Gross tonnage	Notes	Image
Breakaway class
The first incarnation of the class came in the form of the sister ships Norwegian Breakaway and Norwegian Getaway in 2013 and 2014, respectively. They make up the smaller sub-class and are operated by Norwegian Cruise Line.
Norwegian Breakaway	2013	2013–present	145,655 GT	First ship of the class	
Norwegian Getaway	2014	2014–present	145,655 GT	Sister to Norwegian Breakaway	
Breakaway-plus class
The Breakaway-plus class launched in 2015, with the delivery of Norwegian Escape. It is an enhanced version of the original class, including a slight increase in both the length and tonnage, and the addition of several new facilities. As with the original Breakaway class, they are operated exclusively by Norwegian Cruise Line. While the Norwegian Joy, Norwegian Bliss and Norwegian Encore are nearly identical, the Norwegian Escape has many design features carried over from the original Breakaway class, and is smaller than her three newer sisters.
Norwegian Escape	2015	2015–present	165,300 GT	Closer resemblance to Breakaway class	
Norwegian Joy	2017	2017–present	167,725 GT	Designed for the Chinese market. Renovated in 2019 to appeal to the American market and make it more in line with her sister ships	
Norwegian Bliss	2018	2018–present	168,028 GT	Designed for improved energy efficiency to meet Alaska's environmental regulations	
Norwegian Encore	2019	2019–Present	169,116 GT	Last ship in the Breakaway-plus Class. Largest go-kart track at sea.	
Genting Dream class
The Genting Dream class launched in 2016, is a third subdivision of this class and is operated by Dream Cruises and Aroya Cruises. They are the longest versions of the class, coming it at 1,100 feet (340 m), but have a lower gross tonnage than the Breakaway-plus class. The twins came into service in 2016 and 2017. They were originally designed and ordered for Star Cruises, but were transferred to Dream Cruises during construction. They were built specifically for the Asian market and have a modified stern.
Genting Dream	2016	2016–present	150,695 GT	Originally ordered for Star Cruises	
Aroya (ship)	2017	2017–present	150,695 GT	Originally World Dream for Dream Cruises	
