= Eduardo Arranz-Bravo =

Spanish Catalan painter (1941–2023)

Eduard Arranz-Bravo
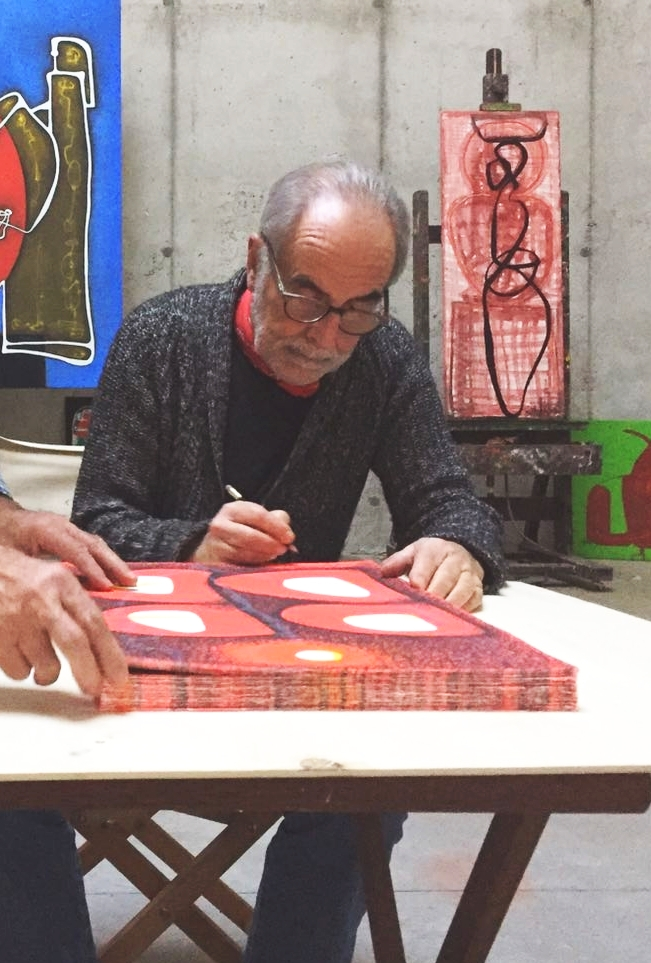
- Bravo in 2016
- Born: 9 October 1941; Barcelona, Catalonia, Spain
- Died: 20 October 2023 (aged 82); Vallvidrera, Catalonia, Spain
- Occupation: Painter
- Notable work: El Pont de la Llibertat (2007); L'Acollidora (1985); Tipel factory murals (1971, with Rafael Bartolozzi); art direction for the films El balcón abierto (1984) and Luces y sombras (1988)
- Website: arranz-bravo.org/en/

Eduard Arranz-Bravo (also stylized Eduardo Arranz-Bravo; 9 October 1941 – 20 October 2023) was a Catalan Spanish painter, sculptor and printmaker. His work evolved from early informalist abstraction into a personal, surrealist- and pop-inflected figuration centred on the human body. Over a six-decade career he exhibited across Spain, Europe, the Americas and Asia, and in 2009 the Arranz-Bravo Foundation opened in L'Hospitalet de Llobregat to preserve and display his work.

== Biography ==
=== Early life and training ===
Arranz-Bravo was born in Barcelona, the youngest of seven children of Antolín Arranz de Blas and Angélica Bravo de Laguna, who was born in Argentina. He studied at the Sant Jordi School of Fine Arts in Barcelona from 1958 to 1962, leaving without completing his degree, and completed his training at the International School of Mural Painting in Sant Cugat del Vallès. Although critical of the academic teaching of the period, he was decisively influenced by the critic Rafael Santos Torroella, who also helped introduce him to Barcelona's Sala Gaspar gallery.

Between 1958 and 1960 he painted in an abstract, informalist idiom. A trip to Italy in 1961, where he was struck by the naturalism of Caravaggio, turned his work toward figuration. That year he held his first solo exhibition, 15 pinturas de Arranz, at the Club Universitario in Barcelona; the show that earned him recognition from Barcelona's critics was organised at the Ateneu Barcelonès in 1962 — not, as some sources state, at the Centre de Cultura Contemporània de Barcelona (CCCB), which did not open until 1994.

=== Consolidation (1964–1968) ===
In 1964 he won the Grand Prize and Gold Medal of the Ibiza International Biennial. In 1966 he took part in the exhibition Nuevas Expresiones at the Sala Gaspar, alongside Robert Llimós, Gerard Sala and Rafael Bartolozzi, seen as a turning point in his career. In 1967 he received the Estrada Saladrich Biennial and Sport Biennial prizes, in a period of surreal-toned figuration, and in 1968 he won the Ynglada-Guillot drawing prize.

=== Collaboration with Rafael Bartolozzi (1968–1982) ===
From the mid-1960s Arranz-Bravo exhibited regularly at Barcelona's Sala Gaspar. From 1968 he began a sustained artistic partnership with the painter Rafael Lozano Bartolozzi, which continued until the early 1980s and during which the pair lived for a time in Vespella (Tarragona). Each kept an individual career, but they jointly signed numerous works and actions — paintings, sculptures, wooden assemblages, editions, happenings, books and designs — under the name "Arranz-Bravo y Bartolozzi".

Their best-known intervention was the decoration of the Tipel tannery in Parets del Vallès, begun at the end of the 1960s at the invitation of the industrialist Isidor Prenafeta: they covered roughly 2,000 m² of the factory's façades, and even structural elements, trucks and objects, in brightly coloured pop-art painting. The work drew wide press coverage — La Vanguardia ran it on its front page in colour on 14 March 1971 — and was discussed by critics including Alexandre Cirici Pellicer (Serra d'Or), Baltasar Porcel (Gaceta Ilustrada) and Daniel Giralt-Miracle and Joan Teixidor (Destino). Spain's Ministry of Public Works reportedly sought to have the mural removed, arguing that its "modernist" imagery distracted drivers on the new Barcelona–Granollers motorway; public support helped save it, and it became regarded as a symbol of artistic freedom in the late Francoist period. In the 1971–72 academic year the pair also carried out an ephemeral intervention at the EINA design school in Barcelona, covering the façade of the Manuel Dolcet tower with a large red-painted wooden cross.

A second Tipel mural, on a marine theme, followed in 1976 on a wall over thirty metres long facing the factory, and in 1988 — by then working separately — each artist decorated a different part of the complex. The murals, listed as a local cultural heritage asset and included in the Parets del Vallès municipal heritage protection plan, were restored between the summer of 2019 and 2020 by Arranz-Bravo himself together with the artists Bernat Daviu and Germán Consetti. A mural on the façade of the Barcelona International Centre of Photography, painted in 1978, remains visible in the Raval district.

The pair also decorated a shopping centre in Magaluf, Mallorca (1973) and the writer Camilo José Cela's house on Mallorca (1979), and took part in the group show Mides Universals at the Saló del Tinell in Barcelona (1979), with around 170 works.

==== The 1980 Venice Biennale ====
In 1980 Arranz-Bravo and Bartolozzi took part in the Spanish representation at the 39th Venice Biennale, within the Spanish Pavilion at the Giardini. Several sources describe the pair as having "represented Spain" at that edition; it was, however, a collective national participation rather than a solo showing. The Spanish Pavilion, designed by the architect Javier de Luque and opened in 1922, is one of 37 historic pavilions with a permanent seat at the Giardini and the space through which Spain presents its artists at the Art Biennale, the world's oldest international contemporary art exhibition. The Venice showing marked the high point of institutional recognition for the Arranz-Bravo–Bartolozzi partnership, shortly before the two artists resumed separate careers.

=== Cadaqués and maturity (1980s–1990s) ===
After the partnership with Bartolozzi ended, Arranz-Bravo resumed his solo career and developed some of his best-known series, including Abraçades ("Embraces") — shown in 1982 at the Miguel Marcos gallery in Zaragoza and in 1983 at the Sala Gaspar in Barcelona — and Pantòcrator (1986–1989). Between 1985 and 1992 he lived in Cadaqués, where he set up a studio in a former sardine cannery. He was the artist most often shown at Lanfranco Bombelli's Galería Cadaqués — up to fourteen times — and became part of the town's international artistic community, which brought him into contact with figures including Richard Hamilton, Dieter Roth and John Cage, as well as the painter Joan Ponç, with whom he also collaborated on a series of drawings. In Cadaqués he also carried out the performance Cadaqués blau on the town's seafront. During these years he intensified his work as a sculptor, in bronze and marble, and as a printmaker, including an illustration for Midaq Alley by the Nobel laureate Naguib Mahfuz, and served as artistic director on several films by Jaime Camino.

In 1989 a large retrospective was devoted to him at the Palau Robert in Barcelona, and for the 1992 Barcelona Olympic Games he designed a series of postage stamps. In the early 1990s he expanded his international presence with shows in Paris, Bonn and New York — where he held his first solo exhibition — and with an anthological exhibition at the Paço Imperial in Rio de Janeiro (1992). He also exhibited in the Catalan Pavilion at the 1992 Seville World's Fair. During this period the architect Lanfranco Bombelli built him a new house-studio in Vallvidrera.

=== International reach (1998–2018) ===
His work reached a wider international market in 1998, when he first exhibited at the Franklin Bowles Galleries in New York and began a long-running collaboration with the gallery. In parallel he maintained a steady presence in Spain and Germany — with shows in Barcelona, Segovia, Bilbao, Bad Honnef and Freiburg — and presented the Faith series at the Museo Nacional Centro de Arte Reina Sofía in Madrid. By around 2010 he was holding annual exhibitions at the Franklin Bowles galleries in New York and San Francisco, and also showing in Rome (Edieuropa gallery) and Barcelona (Àmbit gallery and the Vall d'Hebron Hospital).

In his final years he opened markets in Asia and Russia: in 2014 he held his first solo show in China, with the Matthew Liu Fine Arts gallery in Shanghai, and his first show in Moscow. In 2016 he exhibited at the Instituto Cervantes in Moscow and again at the Franklin Bowles galleries in New York and San Francisco, and in 2018 he took part in the Art Shenzhen fair and returned to the Matthew Liu gallery in Shanghai. For his 75th anniversary in 2017, the Arranz-Bravo Foundation devoted a retrospective to him with 75 works selected by 75 figures from the art world.

In 2018 he received an unusual international commission: Norwegian Cruise Line chose him to design the hull art for the Norwegian Encore, launched in 2019, for which he devised an abstract, brightly coloured composition inspired by his life beside the sea in Barcelona; he also painted a large canvas for the line's new terminal in Miami. For his 80th birthday, rather than a retrospective, he chose to show recent work in the exhibition Presente continuo (2020–2021).

=== The Vallvidrera studio ===
In 2013 the architecture firm Garcés – De Seta – Bonet (Jordi Garcés, Daria De Seta and Anna Bonet) designed a new studio for the artist in the Barcelona neighbourhood of Vallvidrera, on the slopes of Tibidabo. Conceived as a monolithic concrete volume set into the hillside, it holds about 167 m² over two levels: a storage and sculpture workshop on the ground floor, opening onto the exterior through a large glazed fissure, and a painting studio above, top-lit through a skylight where the roof's four sloped planes meet. The building was a finalist at the 2014 FAD architecture awards. He continued to work there until the end of his life.

=== Death ===
Arranz-Bravo died on the morning of 20 October 2023 at his Vallvidrera studio, aged 82. His memoirs, written with the art critic Jordi Garrido, were presented on 22 November that year. His death was mourned by Catalan cultural institutions and officials, who highlighted his international recognition and his close ties to L'Hospitalet de Llobregat.

== Style ==
Critics place the starting point of Arranz-Bravo's work in post-war informalism, from which he moved away during the 1960s to develop a figurative language shaped by surrealism and pop art. He worked across painting, drawing, lithography and sculpture, with an experimental treatment of the human body; he described all of his works as, at bottom, self-portraits.

== Arranz-Bravo Foundation and L'Hospitalet de Llobregat ==
Arranz-Bravo's connection to L'Hospitalet de Llobregat materialised in the Arranz-Bravo Foundation, a contemporary-art space with a twofold aim: to disseminate the painter's work and to support young contemporary creation. A first showing of its holdings was presented in 2006 at the Tecla Sala Cultural Centre, and the Foundation's provisional premises opened on 17 September 2009, the same year the Barcelona Provincial Council organised a touring exhibition of the collection across Catalonia.

The provisional site occupies the former warehouses of the Tecla Sala textile factory, designed by the architect Jordi Garcés, pending its planned permanent home at L'Hospitalet's old mill. It is part of the Barcelona Provincial Council's Local Museum Network and holds a collection of some 340 works donated by the artist — paintings, works on paper, prints and sculpture — spanning his different creative periods. Alongside the artist's own work, the Foundation runs exhibitions of emerging art and contemporary thought and an extensive education programme for local schools and community centres.

His public art in the city includes two sculptures. L'Acollidora ("The Welcomer"), a bronze sculpture commissioned in the mid-1980s under mayor Juan Ignacio Pujana and unveiled in 1985, stands on the Rambla de Just Oliveras and is one of the pieces most closely identified with L'Hospitalet. El Pont de la Llibertat ("Liberty Bridge"), a steel sculpture on Avinguda del Carrilet dedicated to the victims of Francoism, followed in 2007. At his death, city officials remembered him as an artist deeply linked to L'Hospitalet.

== Collections ==
Arranz-Bravo's work is held in public and private collections in several countries. In Spain it is in the Museo Nacional Centro de Arte Reina Sofía in Madrid, the Museu d'Art Contemporani de Barcelona (MACBA), the Bilbao Fine Arts Museum, the Fine Arts Museum of Vitoria-Gasteiz, and the Vicente Aguilera Cerní Contemporary Art Museum in Vilafamés (MACVAC). Outside Spain it is held in the São Paulo Museum of Modern Art and the Franklin Bowles Galleries in New York. It also forms part of the Arranz-Bravo Foundation's own collection in L'Hospitalet and is one of the most extensively represented artists in the Bassat Collection of Catalan contemporary art, assembled by the advertising executive Lluís Bassat, which holds more than fifty of his works across painting, drawing and sculpture.

== Posthumous exhibitions ==
From 3 July to 31 August 2026, the Museum of Sant Andreu de Llavaneres (Museu Arxiu de Llavaneres, Can Caralt) held the exhibition Arranz-Bravo. Obres de la Col·lecció Bassat, curated by Núria Poch and organised with the Consorci Museu d'Art Contemporani de Mataró. The show brought together works from the Bassat Collection dating from 1969 to 2011 — including Llar de foc (1969), Dona deu minuts (1971), Berlin night (1994) and Tríptic Triangle (2011) — and its catalogue included a text by Lluís Bassat.

== Awards ==
- Grand Prize and Gold Medal, Ibiza International Biennial (1964)
- Estrada Saladrich Biennial and Sport Biennial prizes (1967)
- Ynglada-Guillot drawing prize (1968)
