= Guy Harvey =

Jamaican marine wildlife artist and conservationist

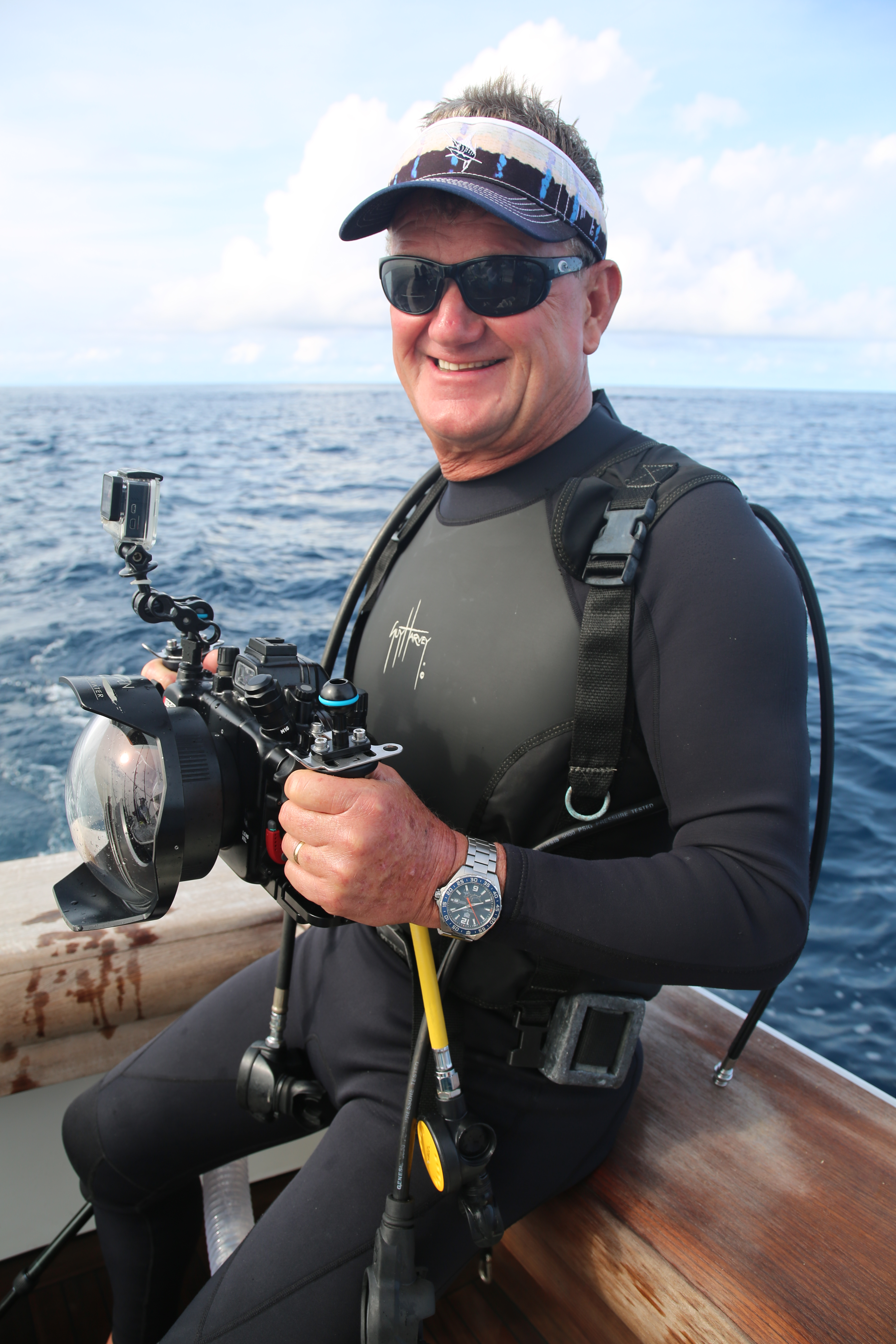
- Harvey in Costa Rica
- Born: 16 September 1955 (age 70); Bad Lippspringe, West Germany
- Known for: Painting, printmaking, fashion, boating, jewellery, fishing, publishing

Guy Harvey (born 16 September 1955) is a Jamaican marine wildlife artist and conservationist. His depictions of sealife, especially of sportfish such as marlin, are popular with sportfishermen and have been reproduced in prints, posters, T-shirts, jewellery, clothing, and other consumer items. Harvey is also a very vocal and active advocate for marine conservation, having established the Guy Harvey Research Institute (GHRI) at Nova Southeastern University in Fort Lauderdale, Florida as well as the Guy Harvey Ocean Foundation, an organisation that funds scientific research and educational initiatives.

== Life ==
Guy Harvey was born in Bad Lippspringe, North Rhine-Westphalia, West Germany on 16 September 1955 while his father, Philip Harvey, was serving as a Gunnery Officer in the British Army. He grew up in Jamaica. Harvey is a 10th generation Jamaican of English heritage as his family immigrated to Jamaica in 1664. Harvey attended Aberdeen University in Scotland, graduating with highest honours in Marine Biology in 1977. He obtained a PhD degree in Fisheries Management from the University of the West Indies in 1982.

In 1985, he depicted Ernest Hemingway's fishing story "The Old Man and the Sea" in a series of 44 original pen-and-ink drawings and displayed them at an exhibition in Jamaica. Based on the positive response he received at this show, Harvey began painting full-time and, by 1988, was providing custom artwork for use on a variety of products.

Guy Harvey moved his family from Jamaica to the Cayman Islands in 1999 mostly due to personal security concerns over the high crime rate in Kingston.

== Artwork, merchandise and Resorts ==
Harvey's artistic style is mostly to realistically depict warm water marine sport fish in dynamic poses in their natural settings. His media include water color, oil, and acrylic. His original paintings have been composed on water color paper, canvas, and wall murals. His art is routinely reproduced on canvas, fine art prints, posters, magazines, and books, as well as being licensed for use in merchandising such as T-shirts, aloha-style shirts, belts, hats etc.

Guy Harvey's Portraits from the Deep is a syndicated television series that combines the showcasing of sport fishing destinations with educational information from marine scientists in an entertainment format.

Harvey has two books currently in print. The first, Guy Harvey Portraits From The Deep is a large-format coffee-table book. Harvey's second book, Santiago's Finest Hour, is an illustrated depiction of the protagonist Santiago's fight with a fish in the Ernest Hemingway novel "The Old Man and the Sea".

In 2014, he was chosen to paint the hull art of Norwegian Escape. In 2015, Harvey signed an agreement with Park West Gallery to offer his artwork on their cruise ship art galleries, including the gallery on Norwegian Escape. Harvey was quoted as saying, "This relationship will broaden the reach of my art for patrons and at the same time help spread the message for ocean conservation."

Since 2015, Guy Harvey's artwork has also appeared on a series of silver rounds (medallions) and silver bars through an exclusive licensing partnership with the American bullion dealer Gainesville Coins.

On March 19, 2018, Guy Harvey Resorts announced Camp Mack in Lake Wales, Florida would join the company's hospitality system and be called Camp Mack, a Guy Harvey Lodge, Marina & RV Resort.

== Conservation ==
Harvey has donated portions of his proceeds from the sale of his artwork and merchandise to various causes dedicated to the protection of the marine environment. He is also an advocate for responsible and sustainable commercial and recreational fishing.

In 1999, Harvey founded the Guy Harvey Research Institute at Nova's Oceanographic Center in co-operation with Nova Southeastern University in Fort Lauderdale, Florida. The institute, which is funded in part by contributions from the Guy Harvey Ocean Foundation, conducts research on the ecology, genetics, behaviour, physiology, and evolution of fishes. Research areas include shark ecology and conservation, stingray ecology and conservation, and artificial reef design and monitoring. Harvey continues to speak on ocean conservation and other topics at universities, symposia, and other venues. His work in the field of game fish conservation led to him being included in the International Game Fish Association Hall of Fame.

In 1997, Harvey partnered with the Pompano Beach Fishing Rodeo part of the Broward County Artificial Reef Program. Harvey sponsored the preparation and sinking of a 180-foot (55 m) freighter, and painted fish silhouettes along the side before the sinking. The ship was sunk on 10 May and came to rest in 140 feet (43 m) of water, with the superstructure reaching to within 90 feet (27 m) of the surface. Christened the Guy Harvey Reef, the ship is a popular dive site and is home to a large number of sharks, barracuda, jacks, angelfish, grunts, and snappers.

== Guy Harvey Research Institute ==
In 1999, Harvey partnered with the Oceanographic Center at Nova Southeastern University to create the Guy Harvey Research Institute (GHRI) for the purpose of providing "the scientific information necessary to understand, conserve and effectively manage the world's marine fishes and their ecosystems." The GHRI provides global-level leadership in the generation of the scientific data necessary to conserve the world's fish resources.

== Guy Harvey Ocean Foundation ==
The Guy Harvey Ocean Foundation was founded by Harvey in 2008 to "help ensure that future generations will enjoy and benefit from a naturally balanced ocean ecosystem where fish and other marine wildlife flourish."

== Awards and honors ==
- 2004 – NOGI Award: the oldest and most prestigious award in the diving industry, given to artists, scientists, educators and other distinguished individuals
- 2008 – International Game Fish Association's Lifetime Achievement Award: first ever award given by the World Fishing Awards Committee
- 2009 – Wyland ICON Award: recognizes the achievements of individuals who exemplify the spirit of the adventurous ocean and inspire others to do the same through their art, research or diving
- 2009 – International Game Fish Association Hall of Fame
- 2010 – International Swimming Hall of Fame Gold Medallion Award: presented each year to a former competitive swimmer for his or her national or international significant achievements in the field of science, entertainment, art, business, education, or government
- 2010 – The Jamaica Committee Award of Excellence: presented to Guy Harvey for hands-on commitment to marine sciences, his inspired promotion of the marine environment and his philanthropy
- 2010 – Country of Panama's Order of Vasco Núñez de Balboa Grand Officer: the highest honour the country of Panama bestows on non-Panamanians; Guy Harvey was presented this award for his work to preserve and publicize Panama's marine resources
- 2011 - Artists for Conservation Simon Combes Conservation Award: the AFC's highest honor, this award is presented to a member artist who shows artistic excellence and extraordinary contributions to the conservation cause
- 2013 - Nova Southeastern University's President's Award for Excellence in Community Service: this award recognizes superior professional engagement activities in the community. Guy was presented this award for his ongoing pursuit of community service and his representation of NSU's "community" core values
- 2013 - Florida House on Capitol Hill - Distinguished Artist Award: The Florida House on Capitol Hill presented the "Distinguished Artist Award" to Guy Harvey for his prolific works of art reflecting Florida's culture and environment
- 2013 - International Scuba Diving Hall of Fame: Guy was inducted into the ISDHOF in recognition of his contribution to the success and growth of recreational scuba diving
- 2014 - Nova Southeastern University's H. Wayne Huizenga School of Business and Entrepreneurship - Entrepreneur Hall of Fame: The NSU Entrepreneur Hall of Fame honors the lifetime achievement of outstanding business people in the South Florida community. Guy was presented this award for his success as an entrepreneur and his contributions to educational, social, and other philanthropic organizations
- 2014 - Elon University Medal for Entrepreneurial Leadership: this award recognizes an entrepreneur who is a leader in his or her industry and who exemplifies the values of integrity, innovation and creativity, passion for lifelong learning, and a commitment to building a dynamic community
