= Norwegian Getaway =

Cruise ship

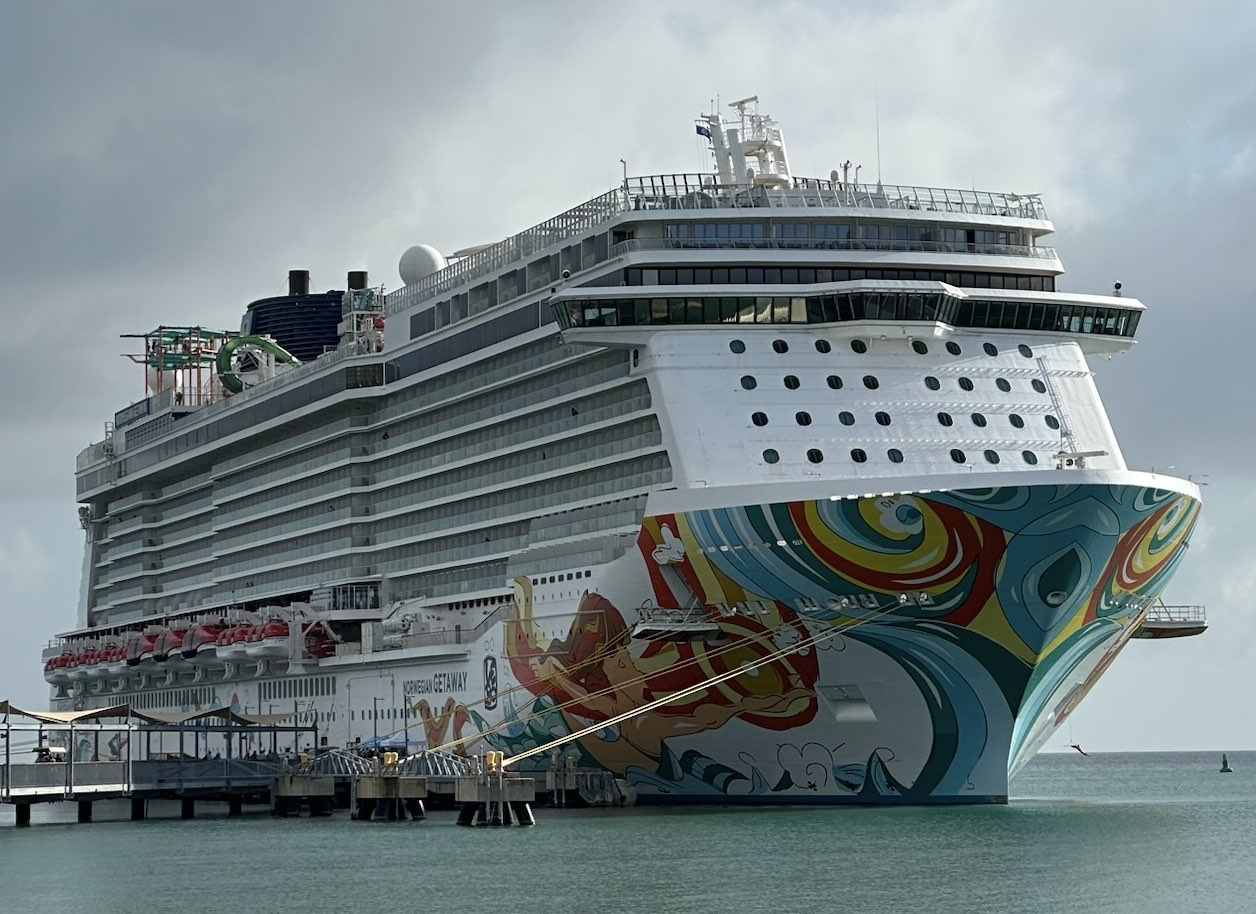
- Norwegian Getaway in Harvest Caye, 2025

History

Bahamas
- Name: Norwegian Getaway
- Owner: Norwegian Cruise Line Holdings
- Operator: Norwegian Cruise Line
- Port of registry: Nassau, Bahamas
- Ordered: 24 September 2010
- Builder: Meyer Werft; Papenburg, Germany
- Yard number: 692
- Laid down: 20 January 2011
- Launched: 2 November 2013
- Sponsored by: Miami Dolphins Cheerleaders
- Christened: 7 February 2014
- Maiden voyage: 8 February 2014
- Identification: Call sign: C6ZJ4; IMO number: 9606924; MMSI number: 311050900
- Status: In service

General characteristics
- Type: Breakaway-class cruise ship
- Tonnage: 145,655 GT
- Length: 325.65 m (1,068 ft 5 in)
- Beam: 44.39 m (145 ft 8 in); 39.7 m (130 ft 3 in) - at waterline; 52.67 m (172 ft 10 in) - lifeboats/tenders
- Height: 61 m (200 ft)
- Draught: 8.6 m (28 ft 3 in)
- Decks: 18
- Installed power: 2 × MAN 14V48/60CR (2 × 16,800 kW); 2 × MAN 12V48/60CR (2 × 14,400 kW)
- Propulsion: Two ABB XO Azipods (2 × 17.5 MW) Three Brunvoll bow thrusters (3 × 3 MW)
- Speed: 21.5 knots (39.8 km/h; 24.7 mph)
- Capacity: 3,963
- Crew: 1,646

Norwegian Getaway is a cruise ship of the Norwegian Cruise Line. She was built by Meyer Werft in Papenburg, Germany, and was delivered to her owner on 10 January 2014. At the time of her christening she was the world's ninth-largest cruise ship with a passenger capacity of 3,969 and a crew of 1,640.

Amenities on board the ship include restaurants by chef Geoffrey Zakarian, an entertainment venue devoted to magic called the "Illusionarium", and another entertainment venue themed in conjunction with the Grammy Awards. The ship is based in Miami and mostly sails seven-night Eastern Caribbean cruises. She was christened in Miami on 7 February 2014, with the Miami Dolphins Cheerleaders serving as godmothers. The ship departed on her maiden voyage the next day.

== Design and description ==
Norwegian Getaway is the sister vessel of Norwegian Breakaway, and was built by Meyer Werft in Papenburg, Germany, for Norwegian Cruise Line. The name of the ship was selected in a competition, and was submitted by Dennis Hultman of Vienna, Virginia, United States. NCL expected the ship to be based out of Miami year-round. David "LEBO" Le Batard was commissioned by NCL to design the mural on the hull of the ship.

A fire broke out at the shipyard on 5 March 2013, but no one was injured and it did not delay the delivery of the vessel. Smoke from the fire did result in production areas and the visitors center being evacuated.

On 30 June 2018, a crew member fell overboard from Norwegian Getaway 28 miles (45 km) northwest of Cuba. The cruise line and the U.S. Coast Guard commenced a search. The next day, a steward on another cruise ship, Carnival Glory, spotted the crew member in the ocean. He had been treading water for almost 22 hours when he was rescued, alive and well.

=== Entertainment ===
Entertainment on board the ship includes the "Illusionarium", an entertainment venue devoted to magic and illusion performances, which also includes a 30-foot (9.1 m)-high video dome in the middle of the performance area. The water park has five slides, including two freefall drop and two twister slides located side by side in a spiral and one kids slide.

There is a Grammy entertainment venue which includes items taken from the Grammy Museum at L.A. Live in Los Angeles. In line with this, Norwegian Cruise Line became the "Official Cruise Line Partner of the Grammy Awards".

=== Restaurants ===
Chef Geoffrey Zakarian has food venues on board the ship including the Ocean Blue concept. Ocean Blue forms part of the area on the ship called "The Waterfront" which allows for outdoor dining in most of the restaurants on board.

== Service history ==
The vessel arrived in Southampton from Rotterdam on 14 January 2014, leaving for two crew work-up day-cruises in the English Channel on 14 and 15 January, before departing from Southampton for New York City on 16 January.

While in New York, she was temporarily rechristened the "Bud Light Hotel" to house 4,000 people during her docking at the New York Passenger Ship Terminal during the week of Super Bowl XLVIII.

In February 2014, she began to undertake cruises to the Caribbean continuing to do so in the 2015 season.

In 2017, Norwegian announced that the Norwegian Getaway will spend the summer of 2019 homeported in Copenhagen, offering nine-day cruises to Scandinavia and Russia. In the fall of 2019, the Getaway arrived New Orleans, where she offered various length cruises to the Western Caribbean. Itineraries were cancelled out of the Port of New Orleans in mid-March 2020, due to the COVID-19 pandemic. In the summer of 2020, the Norwegian Getaway began 10-/11-day cruises around the Mediterranean from her summer homeport in Civitavecchia, calling at ports in the Greek Isles, Italy, and various other ports in the Western and Eastern Mediterranean.
