= Norwegian Escape =

Cruise ship

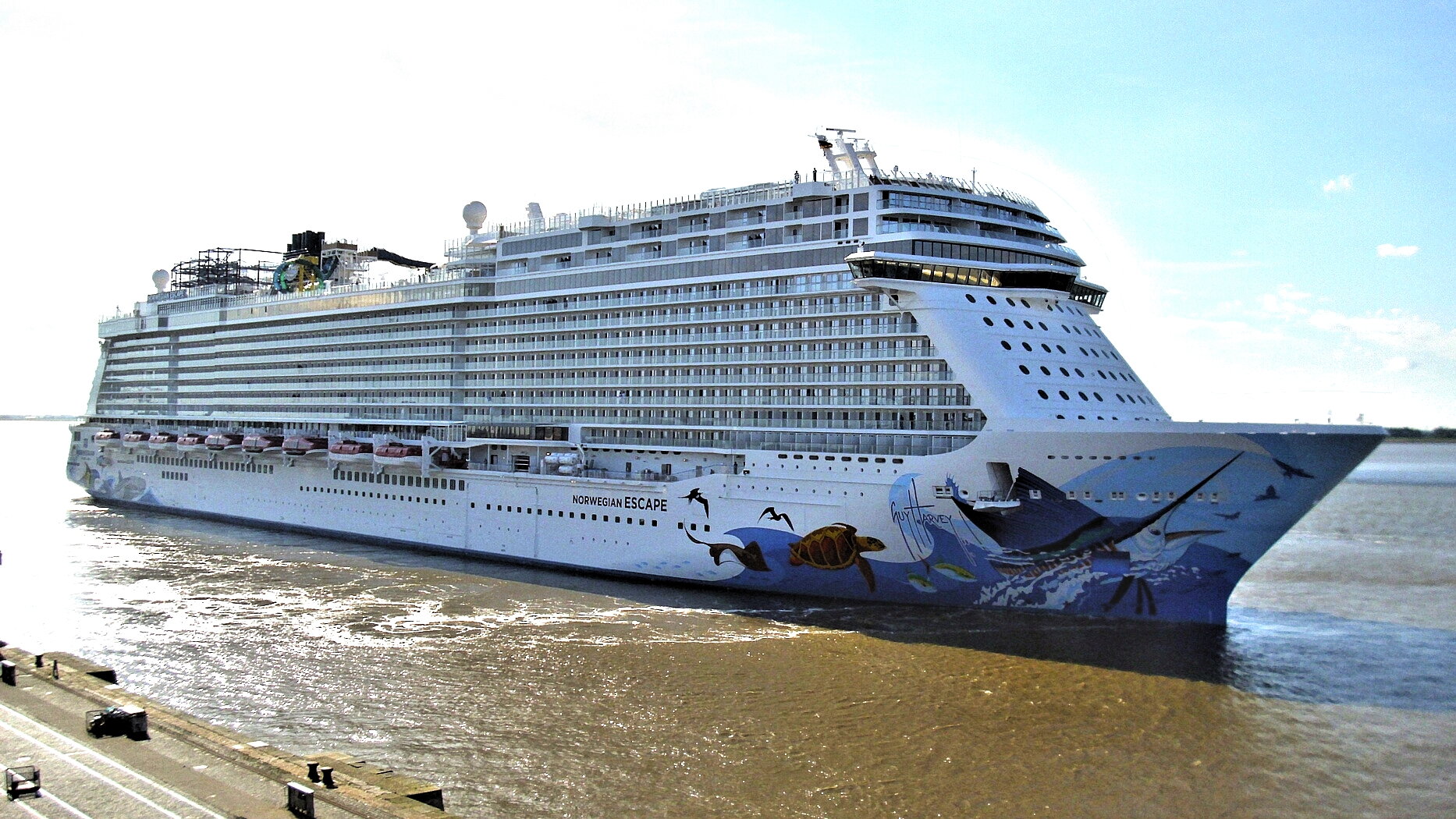
- Norwegian Escape in Bremerhaven, 2015

History

Bahamas
- Name: Norwegian Escape
- Owner: Norwegian Cruise Line Holdings
- Operator: Norwegian Cruise Line
- Port of registry: Nassau, Bahamas
- Ordered: 18 October 2012
- Builder: Meyer Werft; Papenburg, Germany
- Cost: €700 million
- Yard number: S693
- Laid down: 19 September 2014
- Launched: 15 August 2015
- Sponsored by: Pitbull
- Christened: 9 November 2015
- Acquired: 22 October 2015
- Maiden voyage: 2015
- In service: 2015–present
- Identification: Call sign: C6BR3; IMO number: 9677076; MMSI number: 311000341; DNV ID: 33199
- Status: In service

General characteristics
- Class & type: Breakaway Plus-class cruise ship
- Tonnage: 164,998 GT
- Length: 1,069 feet (325.9 m)
- Beam: 136 feet (41.4 m) (waterline); 153 feet (46.5 m) (max)
- Draft: 28.29 feet (8.622 m)
- Decks: 20
- Installed power: 2 × MAN 14V48/60CR (2 × 16,800 kW); 3 × MAN 12V48/60CR (3 × 14,400 kW); 1 × Cat 3516C DH (1 × 2,500 kW)
- Propulsion: Diesel-electric: 2 × ABB Azipod XO units (2 × 20 MW); 3 × Brunvoll AS FU 115 LTC3000 thrusters (3 × 3.5 MW)
- Speed: 23 kn
- Capacity: 4,266
- Crew: 1,733

Norwegian Escape is a Breakaway Plus-class cruise ship operated by Norwegian Cruise Line (NCL), a subsidiary of Norwegian Cruise Line Holdings. She was the fleet's first Breakaway Plus-class ship to be delivered and was designed with larger dimensions and gross tonnage than her older sister ships, Norwegian Breakaway and Norwegian Getaway, at 164,998 GT.

After NCL ordered the ship with German shipbuilder Meyer Werft in October 2012 at an estimated cost of €700 million, her keel was laid in September 2014 and she was floated out from the building dock in August 2015. She was subsequently delivered in October 2015 and was officially christened by Pitbull in Miami on 9 November 2015. Since her debut, she has homeported in Miami, New York City, and Port Canaveral, operating itineraries to the Caribbean, Bermuda, and the Maritimes.

== Design ==
The passenger accommodations built on the 164,998 GT-vessel include 407 inside cabins, 114 oceanview cabins, 1,168 balcony cabins, 308 "mini-suite" cabins, and 82 studio cabins for solo travelers as well as 47 wheelchair-accessible cabins. 95 additional suite cabins across two decks were designed with conjoining use of exclusive facilities. The ship's increase in double occupancy capacity from 3,969 of her older sister ships to approximately 4,270 resulted from an additional deck built for cabins. The ship was also widened by 5 feet (1.5 m), which increased the width of balconies by 40 centimetres (1.3 ft).

The core of the specialty dining and entertainment venues aboard Norwegian Escape lies within an expanded three-deck complex positioned in the center of the ship across the sixth, seventh, and eighth decks. It was first unveiled on Norwegian Breakaway and Norwegian Getaway and is also accompanied by an outdoor promenade, called The Waterfront, designed for al fresco dining. The complex includes numerous bars, restaurants, lounges, and a casino.

Norwegian Escape was also built with the largest water park in the NCL fleet. The sports complex additionally includes a three-story ropes course and various other ball courts.

== Construction ==
On 18 October 2012, NCL announced that it had entered into an agreement with German shipbuilder Meyer Werft to order its third Breakaway-class cruise ship, a 4,200-passenger vessel scheduled for delivery in October 2015 at an estimated cost of €700 million. NCL chief executive officer Kevin Sheehan explained that the robust booking demand that the company saw for its first ordered Breakaway-class vessel gave the company confidence to move forward on its "Breakaway Plus" expansion plans following the investments NCL had made towards its onboard product. The new ship would be the fleet's first Breakaway Plus-class ship and would include additional passenger cabins and space for venues compared to her older sister ships. On 8 October 2013, NCL announced the name of the estimated 163,000 GT ship as Norwegian Escape, which was chosen from an online naming contest it had organized for fans on Facebook in September.

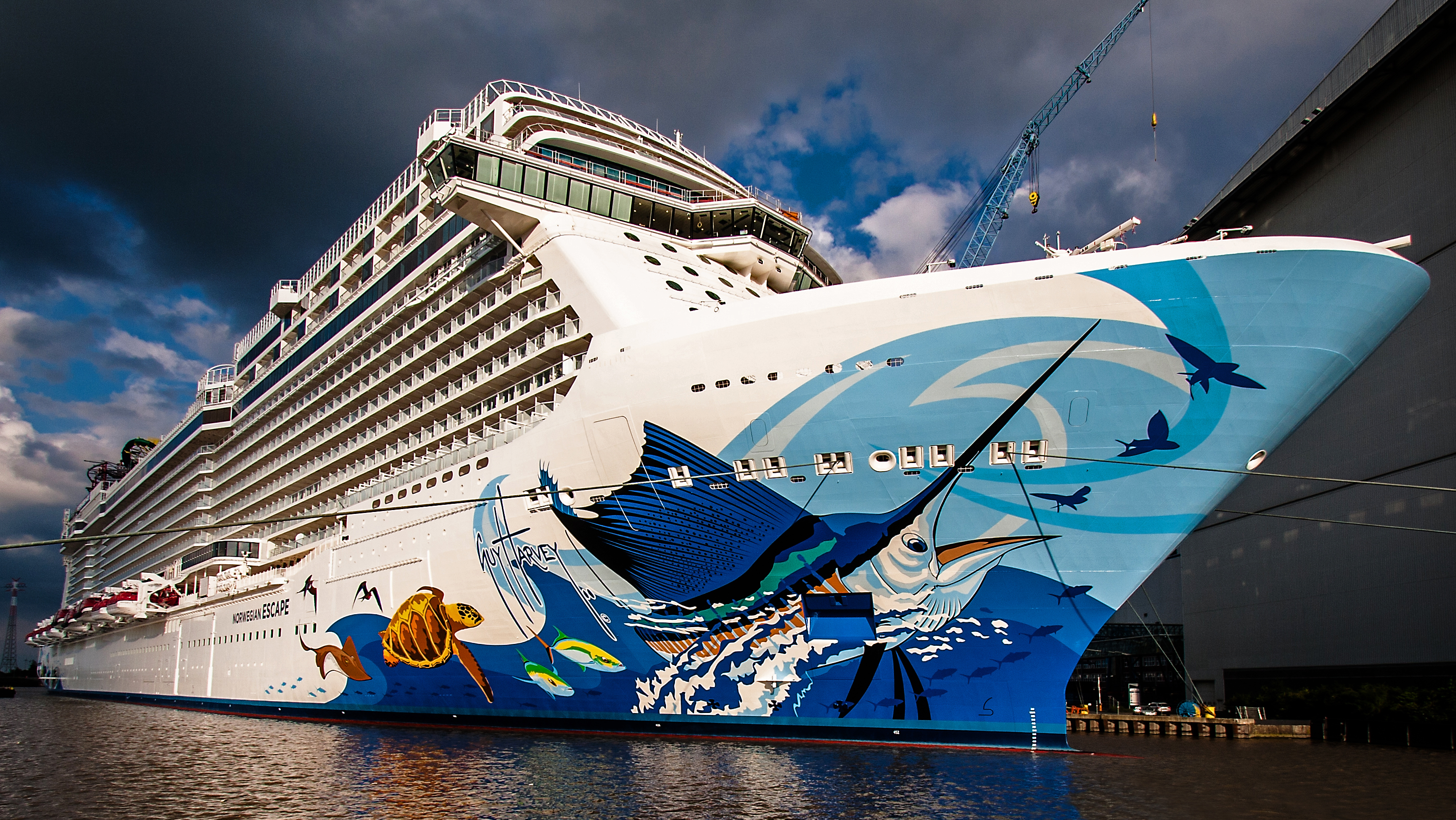
Guy Harvey's hull art on the bow of Norwegian Escape

On 12 March 2014, NCL revealed marine wildlife artist Guy Harvey would design the new ship's hull art with his depictions of various sea creatures. Meyer Werft marked the beginning of preparation for Norwegian Escape at its shipyard in Papenburg with the steel cutting on 20 March 2014. Construction began on 19 September 2014 when Sheehan performed the coin ceremony at the keel laying ceremony, where the first of her 86 steel blocks was lifted into the dock. She was floated out from the covered dry dock on 15 August 2015 for final outfitting before she began her conveyance along the Ems on 18 September 2015 from Papenburg to reach Eemshaven the next day. After a period of sea trials, Norwegian Escape was delivered by Meyer Werft to NCL in Bremerhaven on 22 October 2015.

On 7 October 2015, NCL named Pitbull as the ship's godfather, making him the first man bestowed with the designation; he christened the vessel on 9 November 2015 at PortMiami.

== Service history ==
Following her delivery, Norwegian Escape set sail from Bremerhaven to Hamburg for the beginning of her inaugural festivities, where she would begin her two-night maiden voyage to Southampton. This made her the largest passenger vessel to start a cruise from Hamburg at the time. After her maiden voyage, she embarked on her transatlantic crossing to Miami on 29 October 2015.

NCL announced in March 2014 that Norwegian Escape would be deployed to Miami to sail Eastern Caribbean voyages to Tortola, St. Thomas, and Nassau on a year-round basis for her maiden season, and she began the operation on 14 November 2015, making her the largest cruise ship to homeport in Miami at the time. She continued to homeport in Miami until spring 2018. In April 2018, she was repositioned for the first time since her debut and began sailing from New York City for week-long cruises to Bermuda and the Maritimes. She returned to Miami in November 2019 to operate week-long itineraries to the Western Caribbean. NCL had scheduled to deploy Norwegian Escape abroad for her first full season operating from Copenhagen to the Baltic region in summer 2020, but the COVID-19 pandemic and its impact on tourism suspended those plans. After more than a year-long pause in operations, she restarted sailing from Port Canaveral near Orlando in November 2021 and cruised to the Caribbean. The ship sailed from Civitavecchia to cruise in the Mediterranean region for her first summer in Europe in May 2022. In Spring 2023 it operated from either Port Canaveral or Miami, sailing to the Caribbean. As of October 17, 2023, the Norwegian Escape sails from New York Harbor to New England and Canada with routes sailing from the Mediterranean planned in summer 2024.

== Incidents ==
On the evening of 3 March 2019, the ship was struck by a "sudden, extreme gust of wind" northeast off the coast of the Delmarva Peninsula while sailing south from New York to Port Canaveral. She had been caught in a 100-knot (190 km/h) wind gust, which forced the ship to list to the port side of the vessel. The degree of heel caused several broken windows and made furniture and other loose items overturn in public areas and cabins. NCL reported that several injured passengers and crew received treatment onboard and the ship continued on her way to Port Canaveral, where she later docked without any apparent damage and was permitted to continue operating the voyage as planned.

On 14 March 2022, Norwegian Escape ran aground while leaving Puerto Plata, Dominican Republic after gusts forced the ship to make contact with the channel bed. Initial attempts by tugboats to free her had failed so it took more than seven hours to wait for high tide in order to refloat the vessel. She subsequently returned to the port to be checked for damage, where it was determined she had sustained enough damage during the grounding to force the seven-day voyage to end prematurely. Passengers began disembarking the vessel two days later and were flown to Orlando on charter flights over the next few days. After all passengers had finished disembarking on 18 March, the ship sailed back to Port Canaveral and returned on 20 March. NCL cancelled several of the ship's subsequent voyages to accommodate time for repairs before she returned to service on 16 April 2022.
