= Ben Norris (actor) =

British actor, playwright and poet (born 1991/92)

Ben Norris (born 1991 or 1992, Nottingham) is a British poet, playwright and actor.

== Early life and education ==
Norris was born and grew up in Nottingham. He performed with the British Youth Music Theatre in Mort in 2007/2008 and According to Brian Haw in 2009. He studied for a BA in English and creative writing at the University of Birmingham and then trained at the Royal Welsh College of Music & Drama.

== Career ==
In 2015 he performed a one-man show The Hitchhiker's Guide to the Family at the Edinburgh Festival Fringe, based on his relationship with his father and his experience of hitchhiking around the UK to visit places where his father had lived. He subsequently toured this show in the UK and elsewhere including Adelaide, Australia.

He won the UK All-Stars Poetry Slam at the Cheltenham Literature Festival in 2013 and the BBC Edinburgh Fringe Poetry Slam 2017 and has published two pamphlets of poems, second being Some ending (2019).

Since October 2018 he has played Ben Archer in the long-running BBC Radio 4 series The Archers.

He wrote the monologues for the show The Choir of Man and appeared as The Poet in its West End production at the Arts Theatre from November 2021, having taken the role of The Narrator in the original 2020 production.

In 2016 he was writer-in-residence at Theatr Clwyd, and in 2018 was poet-in-residence at the Inspire Poetry Festival in Nottingham.

From 2019 to 2021 he was a creative associate at Nottingham Playhouse.

In 2019 he wrote, created and directed Track Record, a spoken word poem celebrating the accents of people living along the line of the LNER railway, fronted by Scottish DJ Edith Bowman.

In January 2022 he appeared as a guest on BBC Radio 4's Saturday Live and discussed his life and career.

== Selected publications ==
- Norris, Ben (2019). Some Ending. Verve. ISBN 9781912565214.
