= Norwegian Joy =

Cruise ship operated by Norwegian Cruise Line

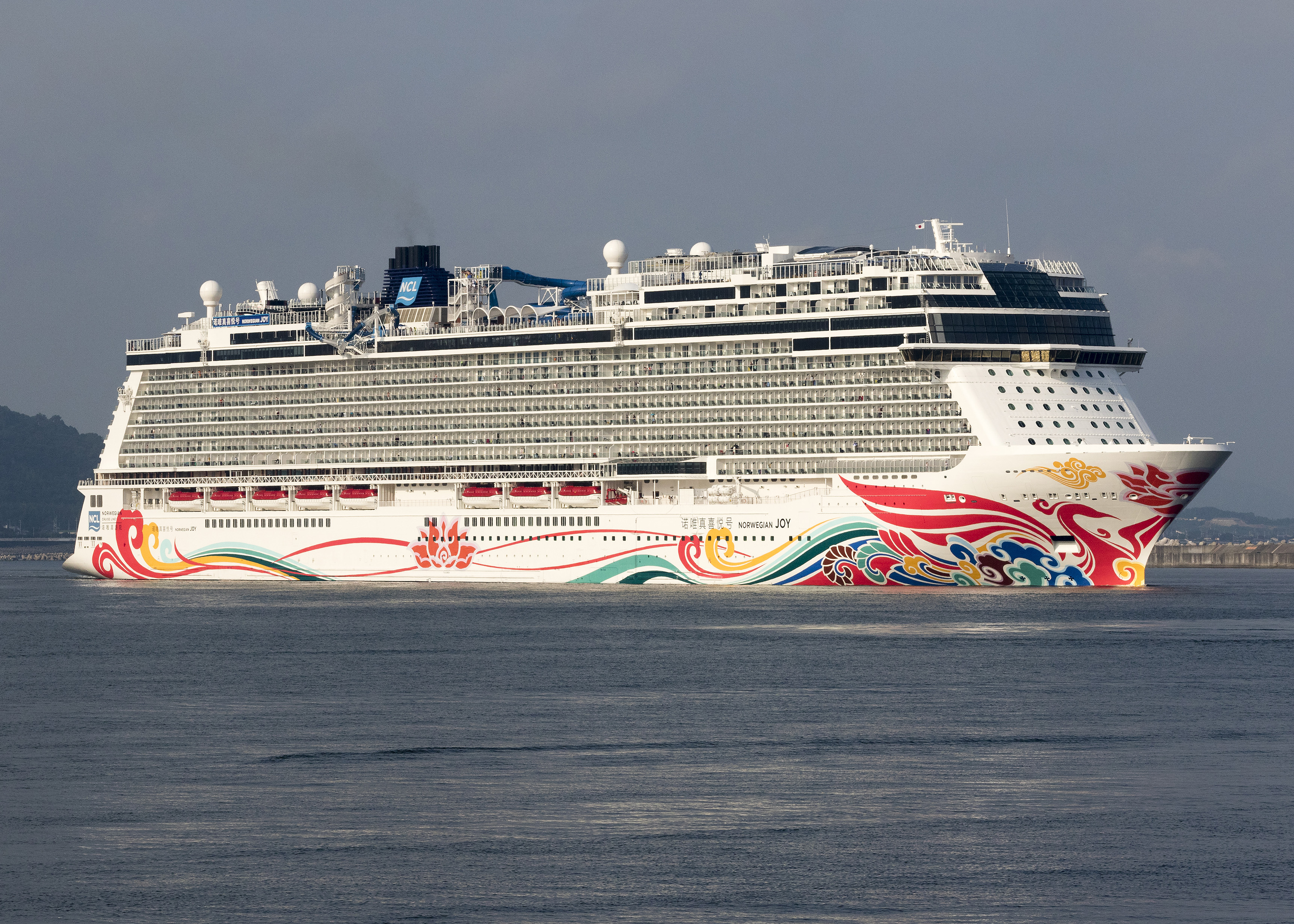
- Norwegian Joy in Kōchi, 2017

History

Bahamas
- Name: Norwegian Joy
- Owner: Norwegian Cruise Line Holdings
- Operator: Norwegian Cruise Line
- Port of registry: Nassau, Bahamas
- Ordered: 17 October 2012
- Builder: Meyer Werft (Papenburg, Germany)
- Cost: €700 million (2013) (equivalent to €782.13 million in 2021)
- Yard number: 694
- Laid down: 5 April 2016
- Launched: 4 March 2017
- Sponsored by: Wang Leehom
- Christened: 27 June 2017
- Acquired: 27 April 2017
- In service: 2017—present
- Identification: Call sign: C6CX3; IMO number: 9703796; MMSI number: 311000599
- Status: In service

General characteristics
- Class & type: Breakaway Plus-class cruise ship
- Tonnage: 167,725 GT
- Length: 333.46 metres (1,094.0 ft)
- Beam: 41.4 metres (136 ft)
- Height: 217 ft (66 m)
- Draught: 8.722 m (28.62 ft)
- Decks: 20 decks
- Installed power: 2 × MAN Diesel & Turbo 14V48/60CR; 3 × MAN Diesel & Turbo 12V48/60CR; 1 × Caterpillar 3516C HD
- Propulsion: 2 × ABB Oy Azipods; 3 × Brunvoll FU115 thrusters
- Speed: 25 knots (46 km/h; 29 mph) (maximum); 22.5 knots (41.7 km/h; 25.9 mph) (service)
- Capacity: 4,622
- Crew: 1,821

Norwegian Joy is a Breakaway Plus-class cruise ship operated by Norwegian Cruise Line (NCL) and is the second of four Breakaway Plus-class vessels in the company's fleet. Built by Meyer Werft in Papenburg, Germany, she was delivered in April 2017.

== Construction history ==
=== Planning ===
In October 2012, NCL announced it was ordering its first Breakaway Plus-class ship from Meyer Werft, with an option for a second ship slated for delivery in spring 2017. Breakaway Plus-class ships were designed larger than the fleet's Breakaway-class ships, with an increase of 17,000 GT to 163,000 GT, making room for a higher guest capacity and more features. In July 2013, NCL announced that it was confirming the order for the second ship, reportedly at an estimated cost of approximately €700 million. Together with the first Breakaway Plus-class ship ordered nine months prior, the two-ship order amounted to a total cost of approximately €1.4 billion.

In October 2013, NCL announced the name of its second Breakaway Plus-class ship as Norwegian Bliss, which was chosen from an online contest it held for fans in September to name its two new ships on order. In October 2015, NCL announced the ship would be deployed to China and would no longer be named Norwegian Bliss, In February 2016, it was announced that she would be named Norwegian Joy, and have a conjoining Chinese name, 诺唯真喜悦号 (Nuò Wéi Zhēn Xǐ Yuè Hào).

=== Construction ===
The ship began construction with steel-cutting at the Meyer Werft shipyard in September 2015. Her keel-laying and coin ceremonies were performed in April 2016, where a ceremonial coin was placed under the first of 80 total blocks to be laid. The first 120 metres (390 ft) section was launched in June 2016.

During her construction, two separate fires broke out. The first occurred in September 2016 and was later attributed to welding work, costing the shipyard approximately €50,000. The second occurred in October 2016, damaging several cabins after it broke out on a balcony, and was also later attributed to welding work. Four weeks after the second fire, in November 2016, Meyer Werft announced that construction was no longer behind schedule from the fires.

In March 2017, Norwegian Joy was floated out from the shipyard. She began her 14-hour conveyance along the Ems from Papenburg to Eemshaven in March 2017 and performed her sea trials in the North Sea through the rest of the month.

=== Delivery and christening ===
In November 2016, Norwegian announced that Norwegian Joy would be christened by a godfather, Chinese singer, Wang Leehom.

In April 2017, Meyer Werft delivered Norwegian Joy in Bremerhaven.

In June 2017, Wang christened the vessel in Shanghai.

== Operational career ==
=== Deployment in Asia ===
In March 2016, following news that the ship would debut in China, Norwegian announced that Norwegian Joy would be homeported in Shanghai and Tianjin once she arrived in China.

Following her delivery in April 2017, she left for Shanghai from Bremerhaven, making maiden calls in Singapore, Qingdao, Shenzhen, and Hong Kong for inaugural one-day events, before arriving in Shanghai in June 2017 to sail exclusive cruises prior to her christening. She began her inaugural season of voyages from Shanghai on 28 June 2017, with sailings from Tianjin between 26 August and 15 September.

During her time homeported in China, Norwegian Joy primarily sailed four-to-five-day voyages from Shanghai to various ports in Japan. She moved to Tianjin for a brief period in the summer, performing the same length of voyages that also visited various ports in Japan.

=== Deployment in North America ===
Norwegian Joy arriving in NYC on June 18, 2023

In July 2018, Norwegian announced that Norwegian Joy would be redeployed from China to the United States, to begin sailing to Alaska from Seattle in 2019, replacing Norwegian Pearl, joining sister ship, Norwegian Bliss. Before moving to Seattle, Norwegian Joy underwent a $50 million refurbishment to redesign her public spaces, with features more popular for a Western audience and to make her more similar to Norwegian Bliss.

Work began on the ship's transformation in March 2019, as the ship sailed from China to Singapore for a 21-day dry dock, continued through the transpacific crossing, and ended in late-April 2019 after a five-day wet dock upon arriving in Seattle. She sailed two preview voyages between 26 April and 30 April before debuting on her first Alaskan sailing from Seattle on 4 May.

Following her first Alaskan season, Norwegian Joy sailed Mexican Riviera cruises from Los Angeles and Panama Canal transits between Los Angeles and Miami. In the summer of 2020, she was scheduled to return to Seattle to operate Alaska cruises, though the COVID-19 pandemic forced the cancellation of the season. In fall 2020, she was scheduled to cruise five-to-seven-day voyages from Miami to the Caribbean, before debuting in New York City in April 2021 to sail to Bermuda and the Maritimes.

For nineteen days in January 2024, the ship underwent renovations in Rotterdam. After a reposition to Southampton she left for an 11 night reposition cruise to Miami, Florida to begin her regular itinerary out of Miami. Some areas of the ship were closed and there were initial WiFi issues during the initial part of the sailing.

== Design and specifications ==
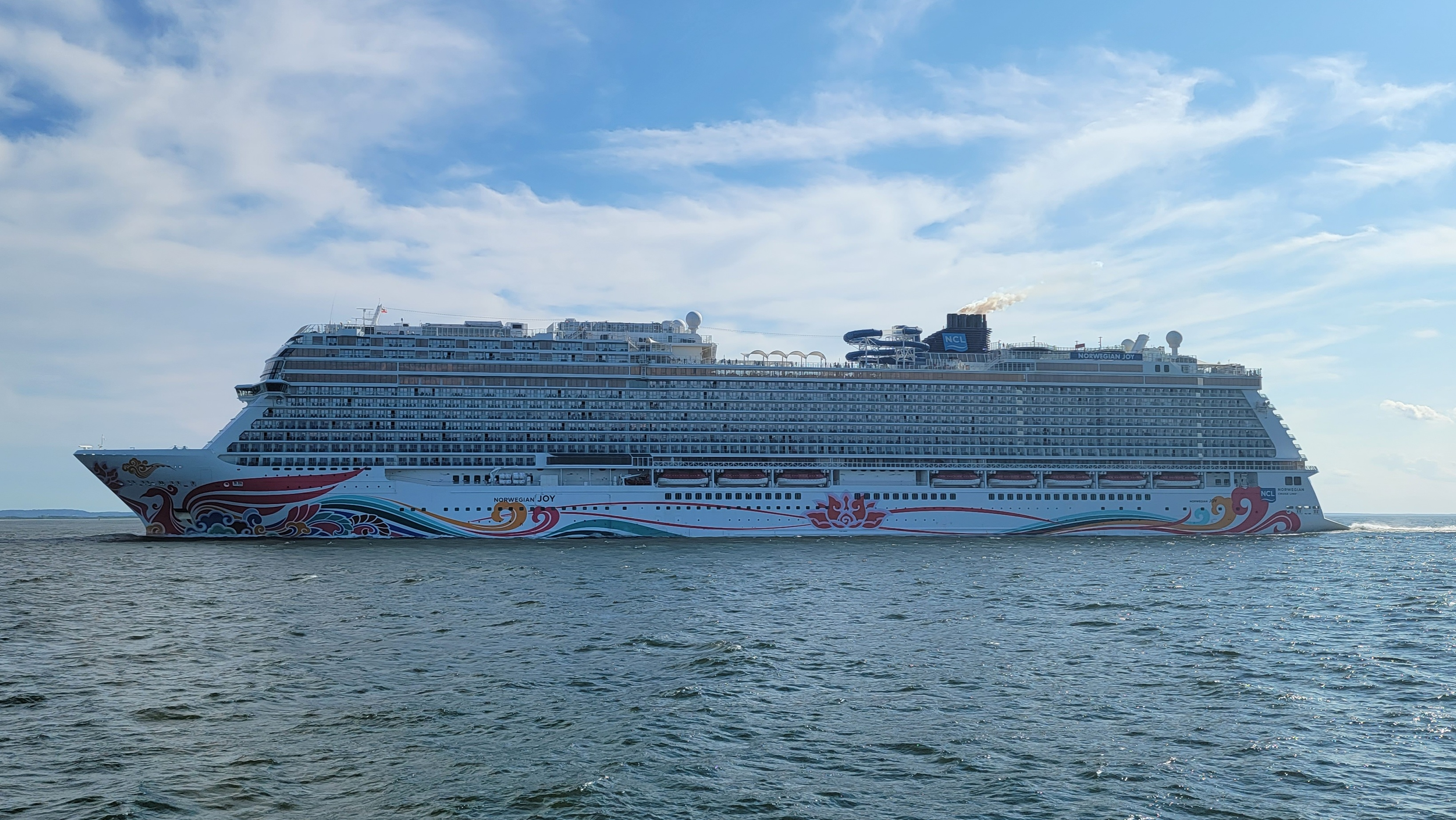
Norwegian Joy in New York City on July 10, 2022

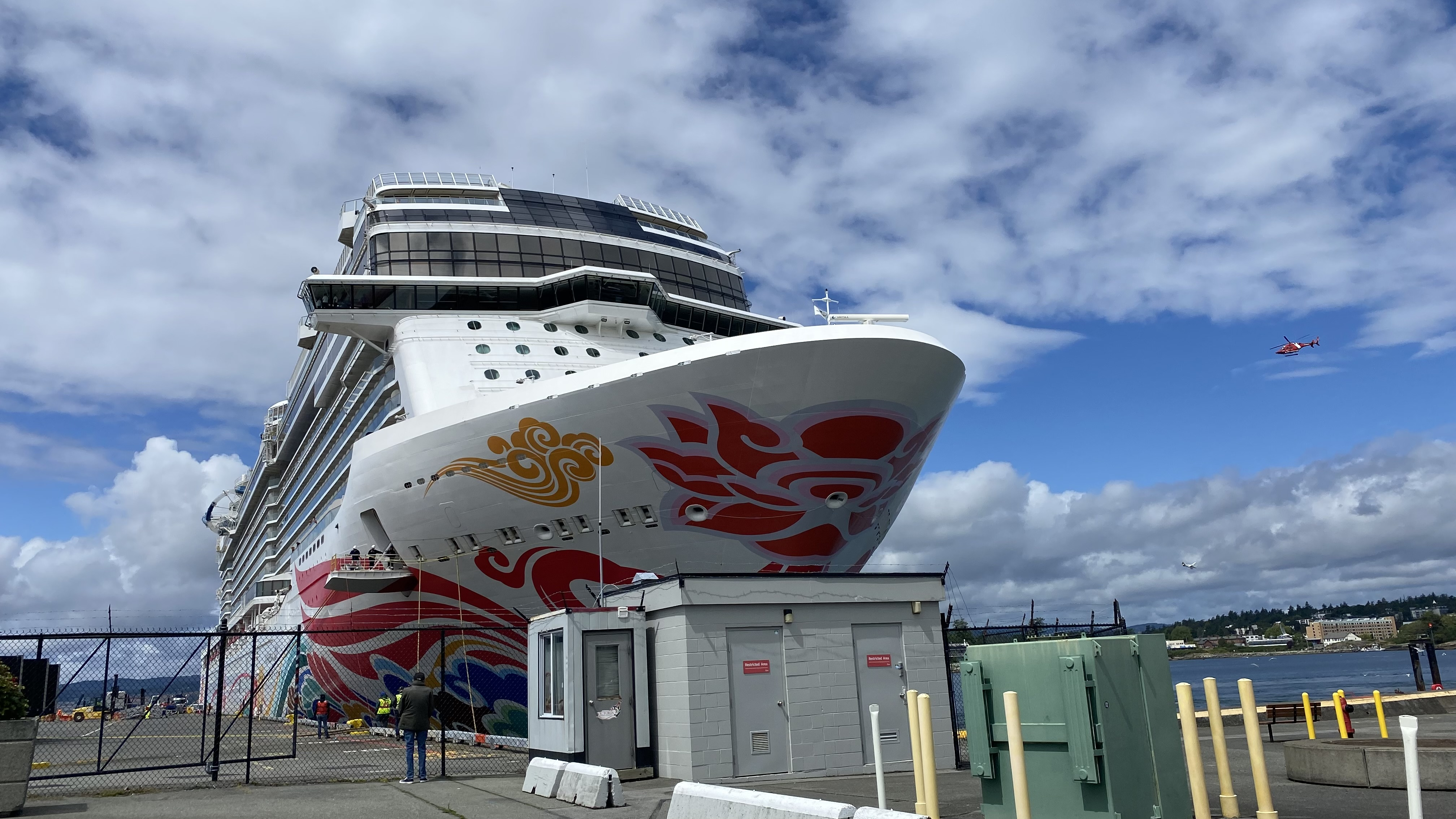
Norwegian Joy is arriving and docked at Ogden Point in Victoria, British Columbia, Canada on May 20, 2025

In October 2015, NCL announced that the ship would be deployed to China, with new accommodations, dining options, and onboard features specifically designed to cater to the Chinese market. In March 2016, NCL unveiled details about the changes in design and features of Norwegian Joy that would distinguish her from Norwegian Escape. Of them, they include a lower guest capacity of 250 fewer passengers and fewer staterooms overall, more connecting cabins and family-oriented suites, an expanded casino, an expanded boutiques space, more restaurants amounting to a total of 29, and a two-level electric go-kart race track. In July 2016, Norwegian announced it had commissioned Chinese artist, Tan Ping, to design the ship's hull art, which is inspired by the phoenix.

Norwegian Joy has five main engines, with a total power output of 102,900 hp. The vessel has two MAN B&W 14V48/60CR, each with 22,520 hp and three MAN B&W 12V48/60CR, each with 19,300 hp. The propulsion system is two ABB Azipod XO units with total power of 40 MW, which allows service speed of 22.5 kts. The maximum speed during trials exceeded 25.0 kts. The ship has an air lubrication system installed which creates a carpet of tiny air bubbles along the hull to reduce drag.
