= Norwegian Breakaway =

Cruise ship operated by Norwegian Cruise Line

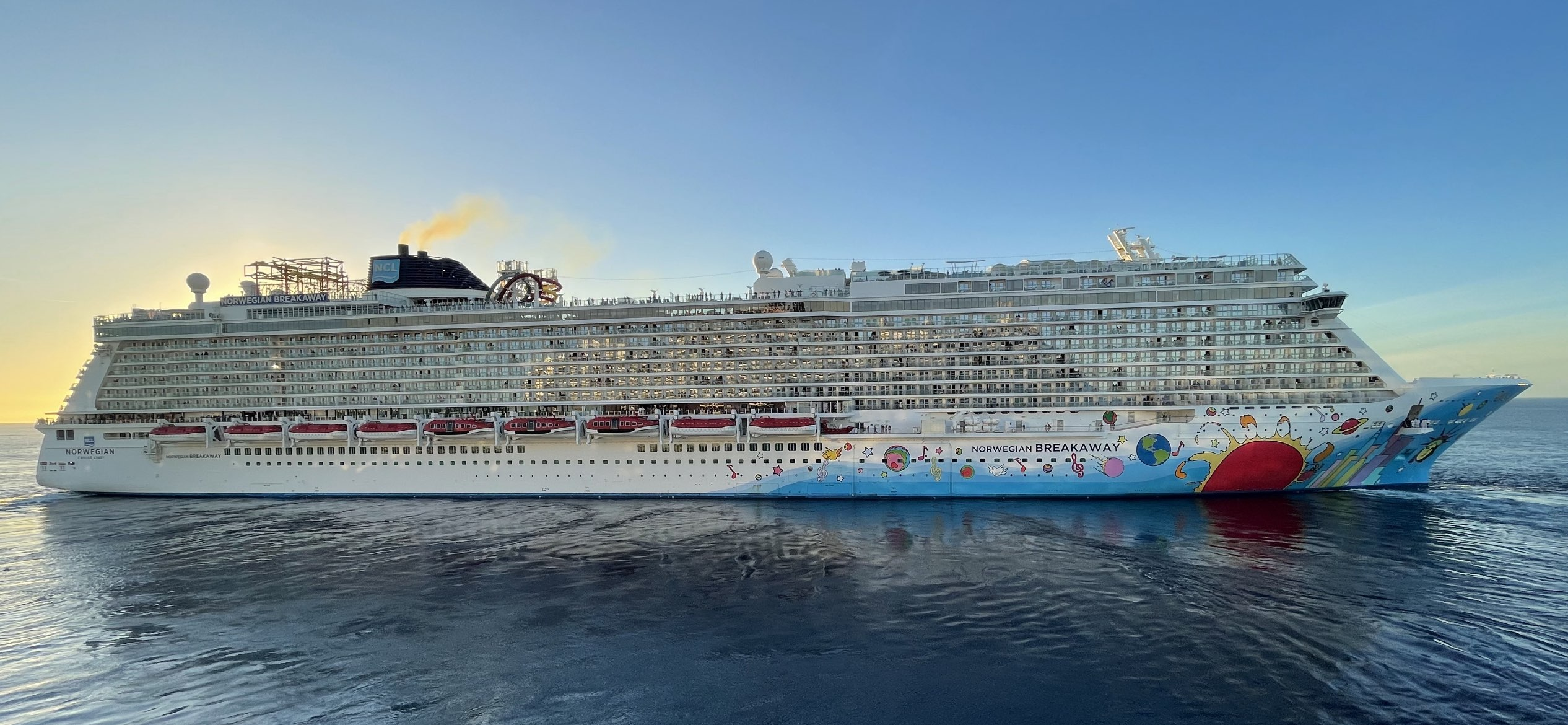
- Norwegian Breakaway in Cozumel, 2023

History

Bahamas
- Name: Norwegian Breakaway
- Owner: Norwegian Cruise Line Holdings
- Operator: Norwegian Cruise Line
- Port of registry: Nassau, Bahamas
- Ordered: 17 August 2011
- Builder: Meyer Werft, Papenburg, Germany
- Yard number: S678
- Laid down: 21 September 2011
- Launched: 30 April 2013
- Sponsored by: The Rockettes
- Christened: 8 May 2013
- Maiden voyage: 30 April 2013
- In service: 2013–present
- Identification: Call sign: C6ZJ3; IMO number: 9606912; MMSI number: 311050800
- Status: In service

General characteristics
- Type: Breakaway-class cruise ship
- Tonnage: 145,655 GT
- Length: 325.64 m (1,068 ft 4 in)
- Beam: 39.7 m (130 ft 3 in) - at waterline; 51.7 m (169.7 ft) - maximum
- Height: 61 m (200 ft)
- Draft: 8.6 m (28 ft 3 in)
- Decks: 18
- Installed power: 2 × MAN 14V48/60CR (2 × 16,800 kW); 2 × MAN 12V48/60CR (2 × 14,400 kW)
- Propulsion: Two ABB XO Azipods (2 × 17.5 MW) Three Brunvoll bow thrusters (3 × 3 MW)
- Speed: 21.5 knots (39.8 km/h; 24.7 mph)
- Capacity: 3,963
- Crew: 1,657

Norwegian Breakaway is a cruise ship of Norwegian Cruise Line. It, along with Norwegian Getaway, are the first two ships in "Project Breakaway" ordered by Norwegian Cruise Line. They were named through a public contest - a contestant submitted the name Norwegian Breakaway, which was announced on 14 September 2011.

== History ==
The ship, along with her sister Norwegian Getaway, were the first two ships in "Project Breakaway" ordered by Norwegian Cruise Line. The two ships were named through a public contest; Kimberly Powell submitted the name Norwegian Breakaway, which was announced on 14 September 2011.

Construction of Norwegian Breakaway began on 21 September 2011, when the first piece of steel was cut at the Meyer Werft shipyard in Papenburg, Germany. The ship's godmothers are the New York dancing troupe The Rockettes. She was delivered to NCL on 25 April 2013. Following the handover, Norwegian Breakaway left the port of Bremerhaven, heading for Rotterdam. Following several inaugural events, she started her transatlantic cruise from Southampton to New York City, where the naming ceremony took place. On 12 May 2013 she headed to Bermuda to start her seven-day cruises.

Norwegian Breakaway was home ported at the New York Passenger Ship Terminal in Manhattan, making seven-night cruises to Bermuda (May through September) and seven-night cruises to the Bahamas and Florida (October thru April). She is the largest cruise ship homeported year-round from New York City. Beginning in late 2018, Breakaway will leave New York, traveling to New Orleans, followed by Miami in early 2019, before sailing out of the Orlando-area port, Port Canaveral, in November 2019.

== Design ==
She is 146,600 GT in size, and has capacity for 3,963 passengers, double occupancy. At launch, Norwegian Breakaway was the world's ninth largest cruise ship by gross tonnage. The ship has a total of 1,604 staterooms and 350 suites.

Onboard features include a restaurant, Ocean Blue, by Geoffrey Zakarian, and a comedy club, in which a Second City company performs. Peter Max designed the hull art.

== Incidents ==
On 17 September 2013, a woman fell two decks from her exterior balcony prior to arriving in Bermuda. On 3 February 2014, a 4-year-old fell into the pool and drowned, while a 6-year-old was revived and evacuated by Marine helicopter to a hospital. On 28 July 2014, a 4-year-old boy fell off his bunk and had to be evacuated by a Marine helicopter to a hospital after sustaining a head injury. On 20 July 2016, one crewmember was killed and three were injured by an accident during a rescue boat drill.

=== 2018 blizzard ===
On 4 January 2018, the Breakaway bound for New York passed through the January 2018 North American blizzard, causing major flooding in passenger staterooms. Some rooms were so badly flooded that their occupants resorted to sleeping in the public spaces. Footage of the ordeal showed the sides of the ship being hit by waves as high as 30 feet (9.1 m), and the ship was at inclination with the shape of the waves. Some guests had suffered seasickness at that point. While Norwegian Cruise Line released a formal apology, the incident had sparked outrage that some guests were traumatized to the point of refusing to cruise again, while some either threatened a class action lawsuit or demanded full compensation. The ship's late arrival cut the following 14-day cruise short by one day.

=== COVID-19 pandemic ===
On 19 March 2020, it was reported that Norwegian Cruise Line had sent a letter on 18 March 2020 to passengers of the cruise that began on 7 March 2020 and ended on 14 March 2020 that someone who had been on the same cruise had tested positive for SARS-CoV-2. After showing symptoms, a passenger had checked into a hospital at Ocho Rios, Jamaica during a scheduled stop and was eventually medically evacuated to Broward Hospital in Fort Lauderdale, Florida, where she tested positive. This passenger died on 9 April 2020 in isolation at the hospital, after being on a ventilator for nearly 30 days. Many other passengers started showing symptoms but had difficulty getting tested.

Passengers were wondering why the company took so long to inform passengers of the initial positive test, as they had started learning about the result through local news sources and social media instead. Passengers complained that, had they been informed earlier of the test, they could have taken precautions to avoid spreading the virus any further. It was also reported that the disembarkation process was "surprisingly routine", with one former passenger stating that there was "[n]o temperature check, no screenings, no questions asked, nothing", and that he "just walked away from the ship, got on a shuttle and left".

On 24 March 2020, the Pittsburgh Post-Gazette reported that two former passengers from Westmoreland County had tested positive. At the time, there were 11 confirmed cases in the county.
