= Manhattan Cruise Terminal =

Ship terminal in Manhattan, New York

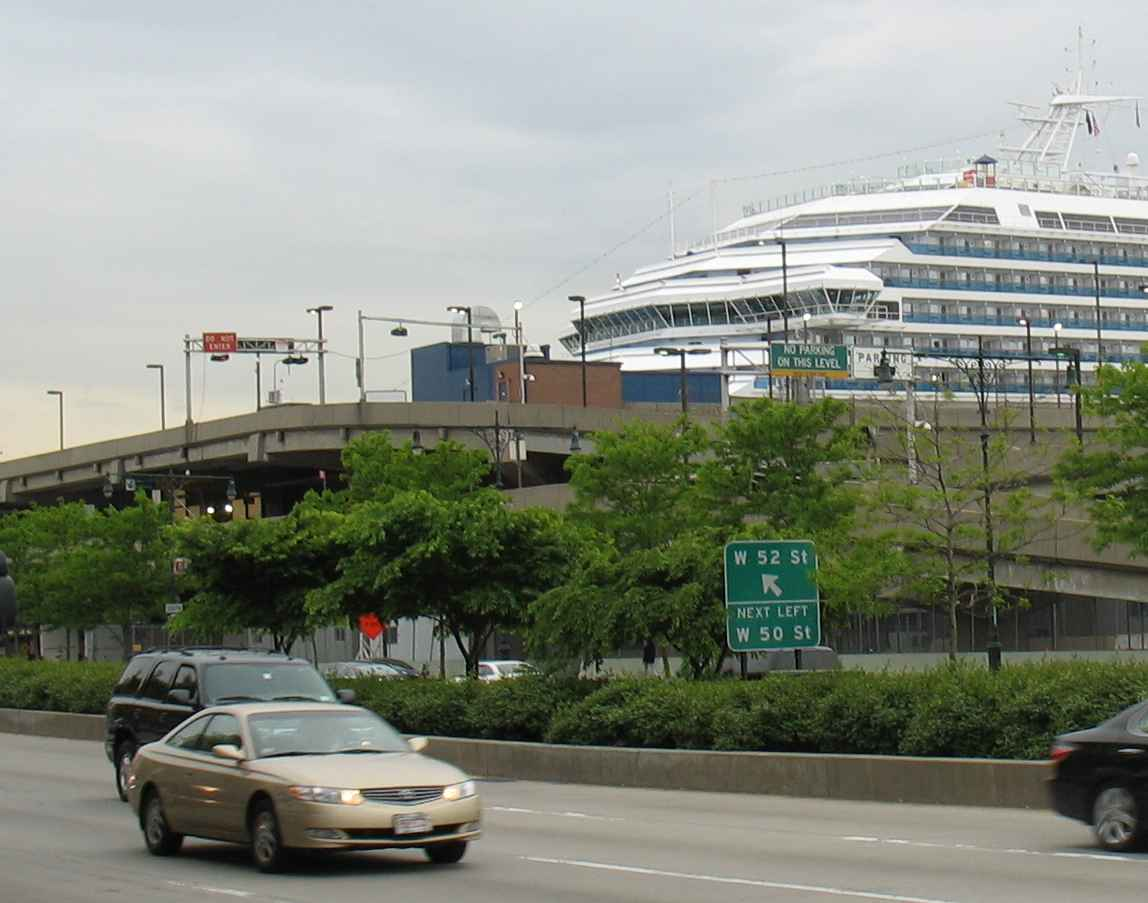
- The Costa Magica docked at Pier 92 of the terminal

General information
- Location: Piers 88 and 90; 711 Twelfth Avenue, (West 46th to West 54th Streets) New York, NY; United States
- Coordinates: 40.767964°N 73.996568°W
- Owner: City of New York
- Operator: Ports America
- Connections: Bus: M12, M31, M42, M50, M57; Subway: at 42nd Street–Port Authority Bus Terminal at 59th Street-Columbus Circle

Construction
- Structure type: Pier
- Parking: Yes
- Accessible: Yes

Other information
- Website: cruise.nyc/manhattan-terminal

History
- Opened: 1935
- Rebuilt: 1974

Passengers
- 2016: 1,025,534
Location

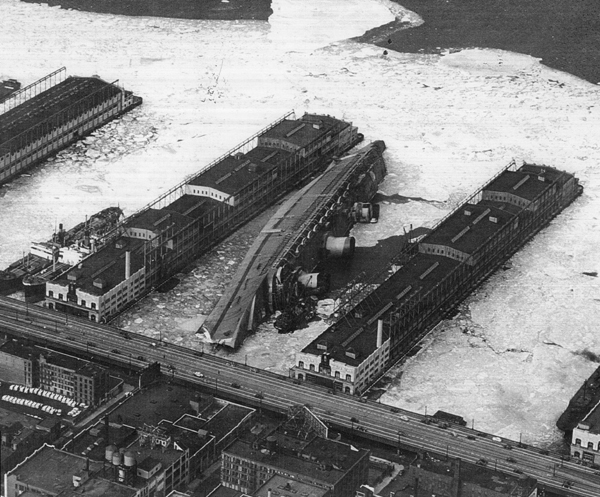
The Normandie, renamed USS Lafayette, lies capsized in the frozen mud at Pier 88 in the winter of 1942

The Manhattan Cruise Terminal, formerly known as the New York Passenger Ship Terminal or Port Authority Passenger Ship Terminal is a ship terminal for ocean-going passenger ships in Hell's Kitchen, Manhattan, New York City. It was constructed and expanded in the 1920s and 1930s as a replacement for the Chelsea Piers.

== History ==
=== Construction ===
The New York Passenger Ship Terminal originally consisted of Piers 84, 86, 88, 90, 92 and 94, located on the Hudson River between West 44th and 54th streets. They were first designed to replace the Chelsea Piers as the city's luxury liner terminal and accommodate bigger ships that had outgrown the Chelsea Piers.

The two southernmost piers, each 1,000 feet long, were initially constructed in the 1920s to keep up with the growth in maritime traffic. By the 1930s, however, even larger facilities were needed, leading to the construction between 1935 and 1937 of Piers 88–92, each 1,100 feet (340 m) long and 400 feet (120 m) apart.

The plan was to lengthen a number of existing 800-foot piers, but the US Army Corps of Engineers, who controlled the waterfront dimension, would not allow the extension of the pierhead line farther into the river, so the city was forced to extend the pier by cutting away at the land. The city had previously done this for the Chelsea Piers, however in Chelsea only landfill was removed. At the Passenger Terminal, actual Manhattan schist was taken away. The results of this can also be seen in the West Side Highway's diversion eastward from West 57th to 42nd Street.

=== Modernization ===
By the 1960s, the old facilities had deteriorated and lacked the amenities of modern cruise terminals. After years of planning, a new terminal was designed around Piers 88-92, to be operated by the Port Authority. Construction began in 1971 and was completed in 1974.

=== Further renovations ===
In 2004, the NYPST piers began another $200 million renovation to accommodate newer and larger cruise ships. The renovation plans included the decommissioning of Pier 92 and for the remaining piers to handle three large ships at a time.

Norwegian Cruise Line's ship the Norwegian Breakaway sails year-round out of the New York Passenger Ship Terminal. In 2011 the city committed $4 million to renovate and upgrade the cruise terminal to accommodate the ship.

=== Notable incidents ===
During World War II, the pier was in the news when the SS Normandie caught fire and subsequently capsized at its Pier 88 berth.

In response to the COVID-19 pandemic, the USNS Comfort docked at Pier 90 to assist area medical facilities by treating non-coronavirus, and later on, coronavirus-positive patients.

== Current operation ==
The current ship terminal now consists only of North River piers 88 and 90.

For decades, the terminal was the only ocean-going passenger terminal in New York Harbor. Many major passenger ships have docked there, including the RMS Queen Mary 2 and Freedom of the Seas. With an upsurge in cruise ship traffic and the terminal's ability to comfortably handle only three large ships at a time, two new terminals have opened in the harbor — the Cape Liberty Cruise Port opened in 2004 in Bayonne, New Jersey (used by Royal Caribbean Cruise Line, Celebrity Cruises and Azamara Cruises), and the Brooklyn Cruise Terminal (used by the Queen Mary 2 and other ships of the Carnival Corporation and MSC cruise brands) opened in 2006 in Red Hook, Brooklyn.

With the opening of new piers elsewhere in the city, Piers 92 and 94 were leased to Vornado Realty Trust in 2009, for the development and operation of a mid-sized trade show and exhibition space, a project that has not been realized. Piers 92 and 94 were damaged by Hurricane Sandy in 2012, and in 2019 a routine city inspection found Pier 92 to be structurally unsound. In 2022, Vornado proposed developing a television and film studio on Pier 94, and that facility opened in January 2026 as the Sunset Pier 94 Studios. Pier 86, once used by United States Lines, is now home to the USS Intrepid, which is now part of the Intrepid Sea, Air & Space Museum.

In 2003, the terminal handled 900,000 passengers, and in 2016, it handled 1.02 million.

In 2025, the New York City Economic Development Corporation announced plans to upgrade the terminal to accommodate up to three cruise ships simultaneously (two 8,000-passenger vessels and one 6,000-passenger vessel) with the provision of shore power. The plans will include replacement of the piers, adding a new ferry landing, creating a marine freight distribution facility to facilitate last-mile deliveries by zero-emission vehicles, the addition of new public promenades and terraces, and improved pedestrian and bicycle connections including a new pedestrian bridge across the West Side Highway to connect the terminal to DeWitt Clinton Park.

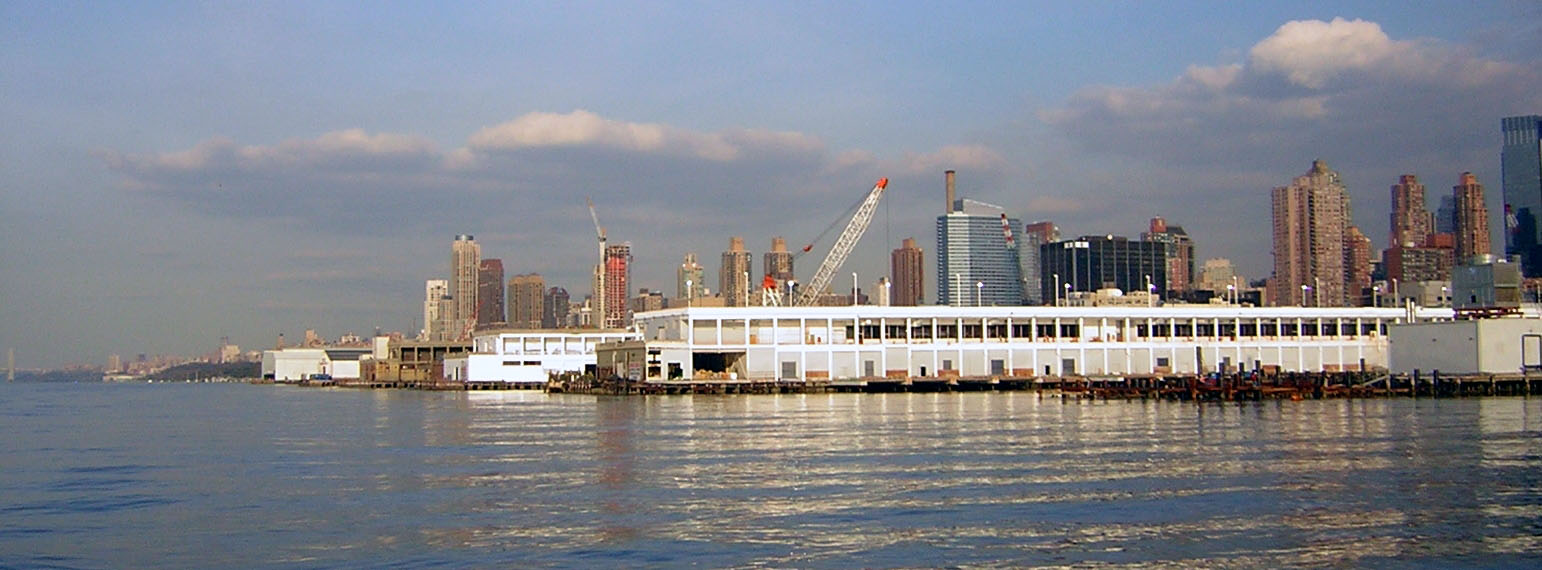
From downstream in the river
