= Lim Kok Thay =

Malaysian Chinese billionaire businessman

Yang Berbahagia Tan Sri Dato' Sri Lim Kok Thay PSM SSAP DIMP
- 林国泰
- Born: 16 August 1951 (age 75)
- Education: University of London
- Occupation: Businessman
- Title: Chairman, Genting Group and Star Cruises
- Spouse: Cecilia Lim
- Children: 3
- Parent(s): Lim Goh Tong; Lee Kim Hua

Chinese name
- Traditional Chinese: 林國泰
- Simplified Chinese: 林国泰
- Hanyu Pinyin: Lín Guótài
- Hokkien POJ: Lîm Kok-Thài

Lim Kok Thay (simplified Chinese: 林国泰; traditional Chinese: 林國泰; Pe̍h-ōe-jī: Lîm Kok-Thài; born 16 August 1951) is a Malaysian Chinese billionaire businessman. He is the executive chairman of Genting Group, a conglomerate involved in casinos, resorts, and palm oil, with a market capitalization of nearly MYR 40 billion, and the second son of fellow billionaire Lim Goh Tong, the company's founder.

== Career ==
Lim is the executive chairman and board executive of Genting Malaysia Berhad & Genting Berhad, also known as Genting Group, a conglomerate active in leisure & hospitality, power generation, oil palm plantations, property development, biotechnology, and oil & gas business activities.

He is the co-founder of Genting Hong Kong Limited, formerly known as Star Cruises Limited. Star Cruises, together with Norwegian Cruise Line was in 2011 the third largest cruise operator in the world, with a combined fleet of 18 ships providing about 35,000 lower berths.

He has a bachelor's degree in civil engineering from University of London. He attended the six-week advanced management programme of Harvard Business School, the US in 1979.

In 1976, he was appointed a director of Genting Group. The Genting Group grew from a single listed entity in 1971 to five listed entities (comprising Genting Berhad), Genting Malaysia Berhad and Genting Plantations Berhad which are listed on the main board of Bursa Malaysia; Genting Singapore Plc which is listed on the main board of Singapore Exchange and Genting Hong Kong which is listed on the main board of the Hong Kong Stock Exchange.

He was appointed the chairman and CEO of Genting Berhad and Genting Malaysia Berhad when the late Lim Goh Tong retired in December 2003. Kok Thay has since expanded Genting's presence globally, especially in the leisure tourism and entertainment industry.

Under his guidance, the Genting Group has developed leisure brands such as "Resorts World", "Maxims", "Crockfords" and "Awana", as well as established partnerships with Universal Studios, Hard Rock Hotel, Premium Outlets, Synthetic Genomics and others.

In 1990, he assisted the Mashantucket Pequots, a Native American tribe to establish Foxwoods Resorts Casino in Connecticut, With 340,000 square feet of floor space, it is the largest casino in the US.

He guided the expansion works of the Group's first integrated resort, Resorts World Genting, formerly known as Genting Highlands Resort located in Genting Highlands, Pahang. It has been voted by World Travel Awards as the "World's Leading Casino Resort" in years 2005, 2007, 2008, 2009 and 2010 and voted "Asia's Leading Casino Resort" from 2005 to 2010.

In 2005, he expanded Group's presence to the UK. Genting UK Plc is the largest casino operator in the UK with 43 casinos.

In 2006, Lim led his team to win the bid to build and operate Singapore's first integrated resort on Sentosa Island, called Resorts World Sentosa. The resort was progressively opened from January 2010 and has become a prominent tourist destination in the country. The resort features Southeast Asia's first Universal Studios Singapore, six themed hotels, Maritime Experiential Museum and Aquarium and many more attractions.

Today, under Lim's guidance, the Genting Group has integrated resort properties in three Asian countries, namely Resorts World Genting in Malaysia, Resorts World Sentosa in Singapore and Resorts World Manila in the Philippines, attracting millions of visitors. The Group has leisure projects in the US, namely Resorts World New York City, Resorts World Las Vegas and Resorts World Miami, and resort property in Bimini, Resorts World Bimini (about 30 min east of Miami).

Lim was appointed a visiting professor at the Institute of Biomedical Engineering of Imperial College, London in October 2009. He was appointed an honorary professor of Xiamen University, China in December 2007.

In 2015, Lim acquired Crystal Cruises from Nippon Yusen Kabushiki Kaisha for $550 million. Following the acquisition, Lim rapidly expanded the company by building four new river vessels, purchasing an ocean-and-expedition ship and three shipyards, and adding a charter jet service.

In 2017, three of Lim's nephews filed a lawsuit against him and his brother, in which they contested a family trust created by founder of Genting, Lim Goh Tong. Another lawsuit was brought against Lim by his sister over the beneficial interest in a block of Genting stock.

In February 2018 Lim opened Resorts World Catskills owned by Empire Resorts Inc. The $1.2 billion complex contains a casino, entertainment venue and hotel.

In January 2022, Genting Hong Kong (Star Cruises) declared bankruptcy due to the effects of the COVID-19 pandemic.

On 1 March 2025, Lim stepped down as CEO of Genting Berhad while remaining Executive Chairman of the Group. He was succeeded as CEO by Dato' Sri Tan Kong Han, marking the first time Genting Berhad appointed a CEO from outside the founding family.

== Personal life ==
Tan Sri Lim is married to Puan Sri Cecilia Lim. They have three children. As of 16 February 2021, Forbes estimated Tan Sri Lim's net worth to be US$2.4 billion making him the 1063rd richest person in the world.

== Recognitions ==
In 2009, Lim was named "Travel Entrepreneur of the Year" by Travel Trade Gazette (TTG) Asia and "The Most Influential Person in Asian Gaming" by Inside Asian Gaming, for his contributions to the leisure and travel industry.

== Honours ==
- Malaysia
  - Commander of the Order of Loyalty to the Crown of Malaysia (PSM) – Tan Sri (2002)
- Pahang
  - Knight Companion of the Order of the Crown of Pahang (DIMP) – Dato' (1991)
  - Grand Knight of the Order of Sultan Ahmad Shah of Pahang (SSAP) – Dato' Sri (2007)
