= Resorts World =

Leisure, hospitality, and casino franchise

Resorts World is a leisure, hospitality, and casino franchise owned by the Genting Group, a Malaysian conglomerate. The Resorts World brand is used across Genting Group's international resort and casino properties, and its namesake cruise line Resorts World Cruises. The Resorts World name has been used with the following properties:

== Southeast Asia ==
- Resorts World Genting – Pahang, Malaysia (Formerly Genting Highlands Resort)
- Resorts World Awana – Pahang, Malaysia (Formerly Awana Genting Highlands Golf & Country Resort)
- Resorts World Kijal – Terengganu, Malaysia
- Resorts World Langkawi – Langkawi, Kedah, Malaysia
- Resorts World Manila – Newport City, Pasay, Philippines (renamed Newport World Resorts)
- Resorts World Sentosa – Sentosa Island, Singapore
- Resorts World Cruises – Singapore
- Westside City Resorts World – Entertainment City, Tambo, Parañaque, Metro Manila, Philippines (under construction)

== Americas ==
- Resorts World Las Vegas – Winchester, Nevada, United States
- Resorts World New York City – Queens, New York, New York, United States
- Resorts World Catskills – Kiamesha Lake, New York, United States
- Resorts World Hudson Valley – Newburgh, New York, United States
- Resorts World Miami – Miami, Florida, United States (proposed)
- Resorts World Bimini – North Bimini, Bahamas

== Europe ==
- Resorts World Birmingham – Solihull, Birmingham, United Kingdom

== East Asia ==
- Resorts World @ Macau – Nam Vam Lake, Macau (under construction)
- Resorts World Jeju - Jeju Island, South Korea (project canceled, eventually developed as Jeju Shinhwa World)
