= Paul Curtis Steelman =

American architect

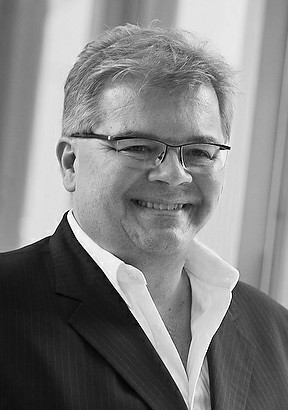
- Born: September 23, 1955 (age 70); Atlantic City, NJ, USA
- Education: Clemson University
- Occupation: Architect
- Buildings: Sands Macau, Solaire Resort & Casino, The Grand Ho Tram, Galaxy Macau Phase II, Resorts World Las Vegas, Circa Resort & Casino

Paul Curtis Steelman (born September 23, 1955), a native of Atlantic City, New Jersey, is an American architect who is recognized as a designer of global entertainment, hospitality, and gaming architecture based in Las Vegas, Nevada, and Macau. Paul has designed buildings for the mavericks of the gaming industry, including Kirk Kerkorian, Steve Wynn, Sheldon Adelson, Francis Lui, Lawrence Ho, Tan Sri Dato' Lim Kok Thay, Tan Sri Dr Chen Lip Keong, Prince Albert of Monaco, Bob Stupak, Frank Modica, Phil Satre, Derek Stevens and Stanley Ho.

His firm, Steelman Partners, designed the $240 million Sands Macau casino resort which was notable for going from "blueprint to opening in 600 days", building a reputation for rapid development sometimes referred to as "Sands speed." The project won praise for its "bright, airy design" and sunken stage which "allows everyone in the theater to get a spectacular view of the entertainment." According to Architectural Record, Steelman's firm had a total revenue in 2016 of over $48 million and rated his company as the 91st largest architectural firm.

== Beginnings ==
Steelman was born on September 23, 1955, in Atlantic City, New Jersey. He grew up in the small beach community of Longport, New Jersey, and graduated from Atlantic City High School in 1973. Paul began working as an architect in his father Edgar's architectural practice before graduating from Clemson University in 1977. He was employed by Wasleski Steelman, the city of Atlantic City, Golden Nugget Atlantic City Corporation and Resorts International, Atlantic City. In 1987, he founded his own firm.

== Career ==
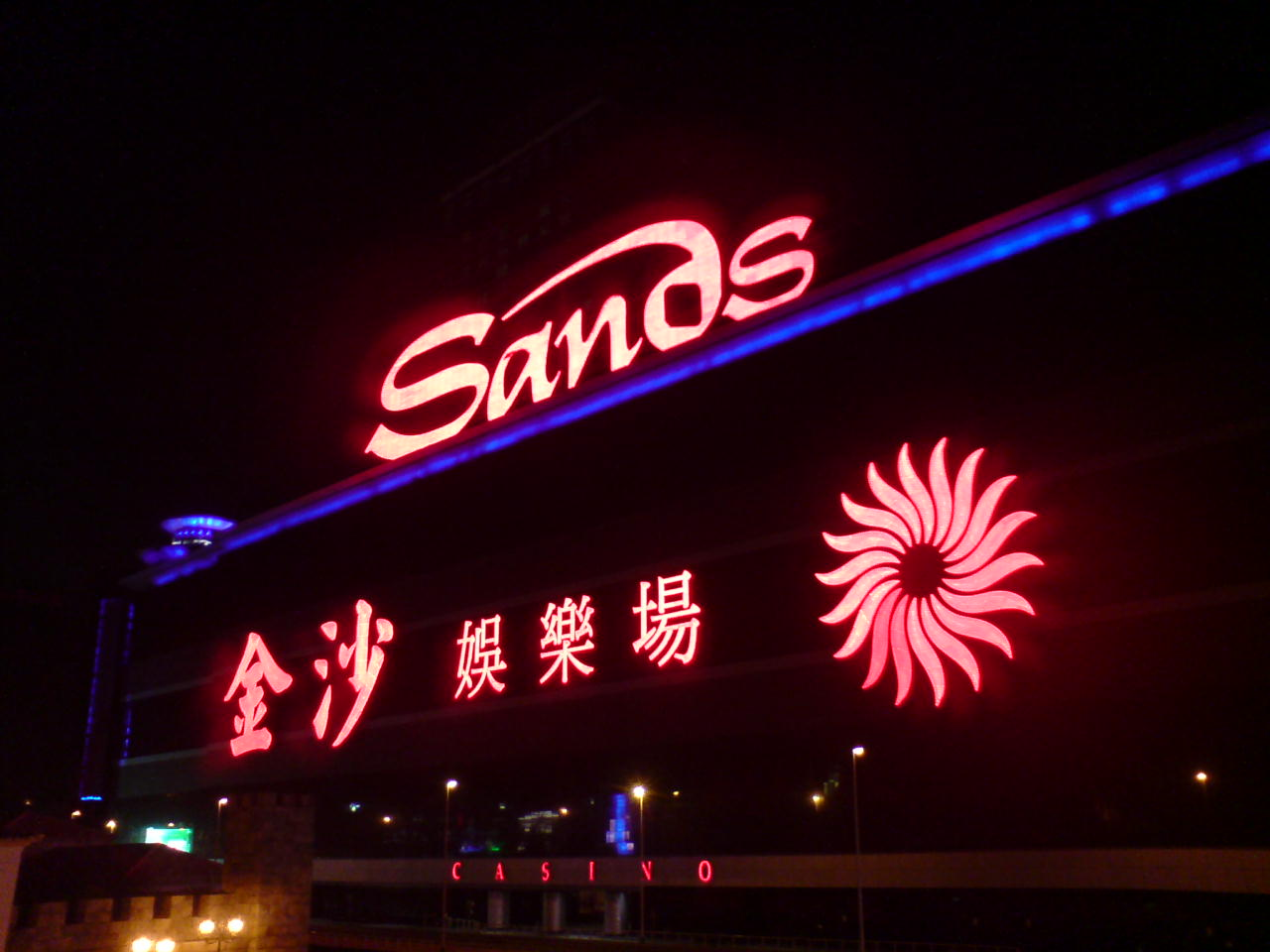
Sands Macau designed by Paul Curtis Steelman and Steelman Partners

Steelman worked on Steve Wynn's Mirage hotel which in 1989 became the first Strip hotel to focus on eating and entertainment in addition to gaming tables. Since then, he has worked on numerous projects, often in collaboration with casino developers.

In 1987, he founded his own architectural firm, Paul Steelman LTD, in Las Vegas, Nevada. His design mentors were Joel Bergman and Henry Conversano. The firm, now called Steelman Partners, owns and operates several other design companies including DSAA (interior design), Shop12 (lighting, theater, ride and attraction design), Inviro Studios (film animations), MARQI (branding and corporate identity), Competition Interactive (slot machine design and manufacturer), Steelman Development (commercial real estate), Steelman Aviation (airplane charter and management), and PCEG (EB5 Regional Center).

Steelman Partners has offices in Las Vegas, Nevada; Macau PRC; Zhuhai PRC; Phnom Penh, Cambodia; Ho Chi Minh City, Vietnam; and Amsterdam, Netherlands.

Paul Curtis Steelman and his firm have designed many casino projects around the world that include the following: Resorts World Las Vegas; Circa Resort and Casino; Sands Macau; Four Seasons Macau; City of Dreams Shopping Center Macau; Hard Rock Casino Macau; Galaxy Macau; Harrahs, California; Harrahs AK-Chin, Arizona; Harrahs Tunica, Mississippi; Harrahs Vicksburg, Mississippi; Harrahs Kansas City; Caesar's Indiana; Caesars Magical Empire, Las Vegas; JW Marriott, Las Vegas; Showboat, Las Vegas; Stratosphere, Las Vegas; Casinos Locarno, Switzerland; Thun Casino, Switzerland; Casino Rheinfelden, Switzerland; Swiss Casino Zurich, Switzerland; Swiss Casino St Gallen, Switzerland; MGM Casino and Theme Park, Las Vegas; Treasure Island Expansions and Renovations, Las Vegas; Beau Rivage, Mississippi, Hard Rock Biloxi, Mississippi, Foxwoods Resort Casino, Connecticut; Showboat Atlantic City, New Jersey; Steel Pier Atlantic City, New Jersey; Solaire Resort & Casino, Philippines; Sochi Casino, Russia; Grand Casino Riviera, France; Casino Grand Via, Spain; Grand Casino, Finland; The Grand Ho Tram, Vietnam; Star Gold Coast, Australia; Seminole Casino, Florida; Sun City Entertainment Center, South Africa, The Casino at the Empire, London; London Clubs, Bahamas; Nagaworld, Cambodia.

Currently Steelman is designing Casino Van Dom, Vietnam; Naga 3 at NagaWorld, Cambodia; Imperial Pacific, Saipan; Lotus Cam Ranh Bay, Vietnam; Genting Malaysia Master Plan; Galaxy Media Center, Macau; Galaxy 1000 Room Hotel, Macau; Naga Vladivostok; and Scotts Valley Casino in California.

Steelman worked for billionaire Phil Ruffin on designing the a 2,750-room casino called the Montreux, an entertainment property modeled after a Swiss-themed lakefront hotel which includes a 465-foot-tall observation wheel which "scoops riders from the floor above the casino," according to a report in Forbes magazine. The design's interior was a "mix of glass artwork, waterfalls and reflective surfaces," similar to boutique hotels in New York or Los Angeles, according to a report in the Las Vegas Sun. Steelman's firm designed a $6.2 billion tourism development in Ho Chi Minh City, Vietnam in 2010. A reporter commented on his design style:

Steelman is wiser than most when it comes to the logistics of moving gamblers through sin dens ... Steelman has, over the last 20 years, come up with 70-odd design rules to keep visitors in a gleeful state as they evenly spread their dollars among betting tables, shops, theaters and restaurants.

— reporter Matthew Miller in Forbes, 2006

One Steelman design invention was a sleek transformable ballroom inside a casino that can undergo several makeovers within a single day, enabling event organizers to use the space for different purposes, and transform it in less than two hours:

Hold a fashion show in the morning, a poker tournament in the afternoon and a boxing match at night. The ideal length for any spectacle in a casino is less than 90 minutes.

— reporter Matthew Miller in Forbes, 2006

Steelman received a gaming manufacturing and distribution license from the State of Nevada on February 23, 2017, for his subsidiary company, Competition Interactive LLC. Competition Interactive has designed a new skill based slot machine named Running Rich Racing, which will be placed in casinos in 2017.

Steelman's firm has employed architects who later founded their own architecture firms, such as Gemie Knisely of GK3 and Kim Daoust and Jordan Bañares of Tandem. Steelman was featured in Asian Gaming annual publication entitled "Asian Gaming 50" as 32nd in 2008 and as 33rd in 2009.

== Personal life ==
Paul Curtis Steelman is married to Maryann Steelman (RN Registered Nurse). They have two children Stephen Steelman a film director and Suzanne Steelman a graduate Architect working at Steelman Partners. Paul and Maryann have hosted fundraisers at their home to support the Las Vegas Philharmonic Orchestra.

Paul serves on the board of directors for The Lou Ruvo Brain Institute in Las Vegas, The Federal Law Enforcement Foundation in New York, and The Clemson School of Architecture at Clemson University in South Carolina.
