= BayLink =

Long-proposed transit connection between Miami and Miami Beach, Florida

BayLink is a long-proposed transit connection between Miami and Miami Beach, Florida. Proposals have ranged from streetcar, light rail, monorail, Metromover, or Metrorail extension that would connect Downtown Miami to South Beach via the MacArthur Causeway, with the light rail or streetcar options potentially having loops at both ends. In 2020, the project was previously approved by commissioners as Miami Beach Monorail, a $770 million public-private partnership project (costing $1.8 billion over 30 years to the public) connecting 5th Street in South Beach to Metromover on the mainland at the Genting property in Omni. In November 2022, the project would be changed to Metromover because the budget did not allow for the proposed monorail and it would not provide a one-seat ride from Downtown Miami to South Beach.

== History ==
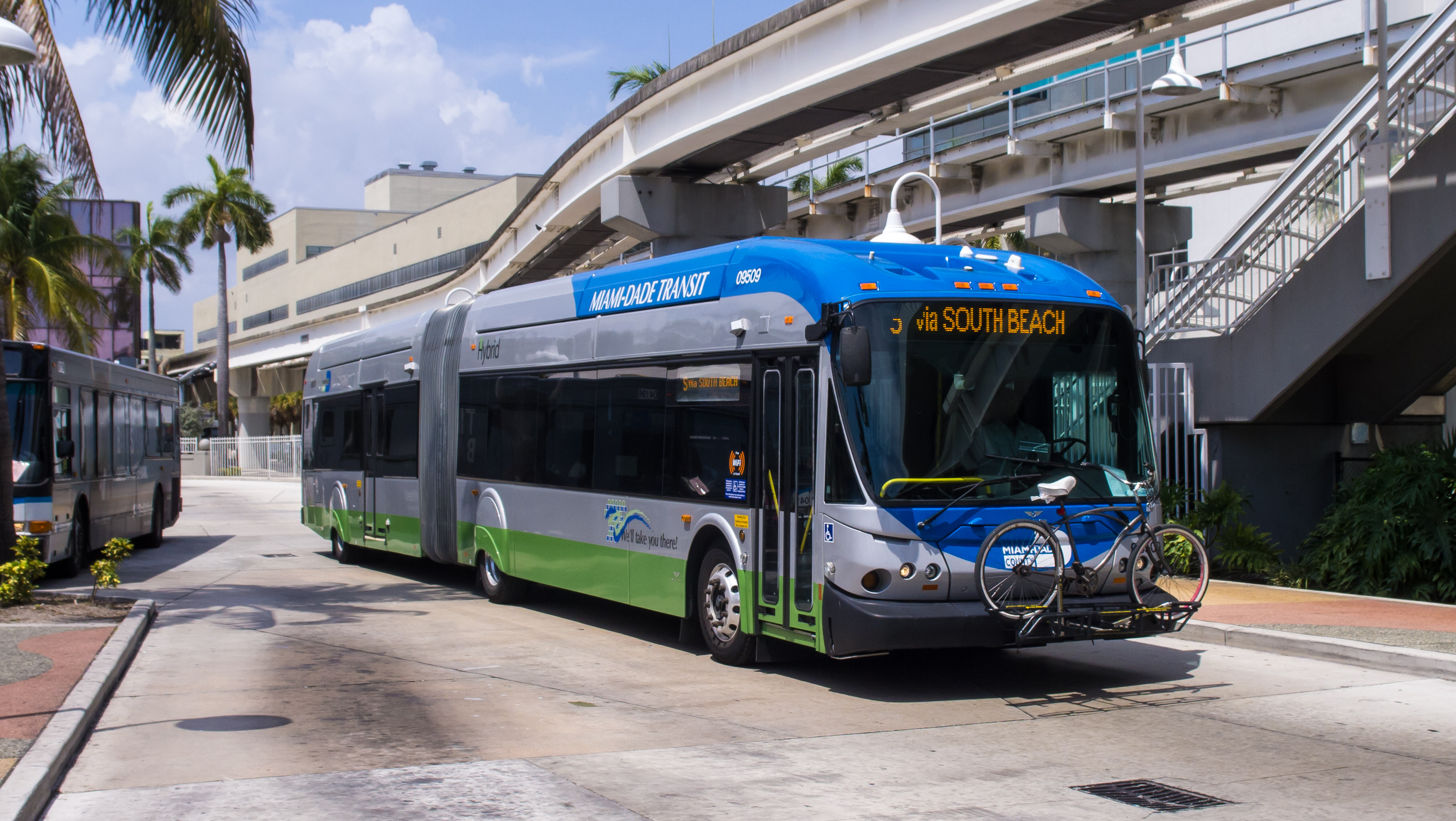
An articulated bus on the busy 100 route (formerly the S route) at Omni/Adrienne Arsht Center station.

The Carl Fisher-founded Miami Beach Railway Company historically operated three streetcar lines from the 1920 to 1939 with the Miami Beach Line, known as the G train, following First Street, Alton Road, the then-County Causeway, Northeast 13th Street, then splitting at Northeast 2nd Avenue with westbound trains continuing a block further to turn south at Northeast 1st Avenue, then back east at East Flagler Street, and back north at East 2nd Avenue

A restored mainland-to-beach rail connection has been discussed for decades and was included as a planned line in the 2002 People's Transportation Plan (PTP) passed by voters in November 2002. A November 2nd, 2004 nonbinding referendum resulted in 55% of Miami Beach voters approving of a light rail or streetcar line across the bay due to open in 2023. Again in 2016, the line was planned as part of the Strategic Miami Area Rapid Transit (SMART) plan, which included the line as part of the longer Beach Corridor, which would connect South Beach to Wynwood or the Design District and to existing Metromover services.

In 2019, Genting Group submitted an unsolicited proposal to Miami-Dade County to build a monorail between their proposed casino, Resorts World Miami, at the former Miami Herald headquarters site in Downtown Miami and South Beach. The county funded a study to determine if the proposal was feasible in 2020. In 2022, county leaders scrapped plans for a monorail following Genting facing financial difficulties, Florida opting to not expand in-person gambling in the state, and local opposition to a monorail.

The county then proposed extending the existing Metromover system from a new station between Adrienne Arsht Center and Museum Park to 5th Street on South Beach. In February 2024, the City of Miami Beach Commission voted for a resolution to oppose the proposed Metromover extension to South Beach citing the concerns of residents, primarily those in the wealthy South of Fifth neighborhood, the area where the three former lines met at 1st & Washington until 1939 but the replacement line would bypass to the north. County Mayor Levine-Cava has called the current plan the most cost-effective option linking both sides of the bay again, potentially an outcome not only of its automated nature and its simplicity relative to other systems but also partially owed to it being shorter than the previous proposals by taking advantage of the existing Metromover network's proximity to the bay and causeway alike and lacking the Biscayne Boulevard and Alton Road-or-Washington Avenue segments. Despite the opposition of the city government, Miami-Dade County is moving forward with the project as of October 2024. While some residents are opposed to the Metromover extension, a survey published by the Miami Herald in June 2025 found that 79% of Miami Beach residents support the extension.

== See also ==
- Transportation in South Florida
