= Resorts World Birmingham =

Entertainment complex in Birmingham, England

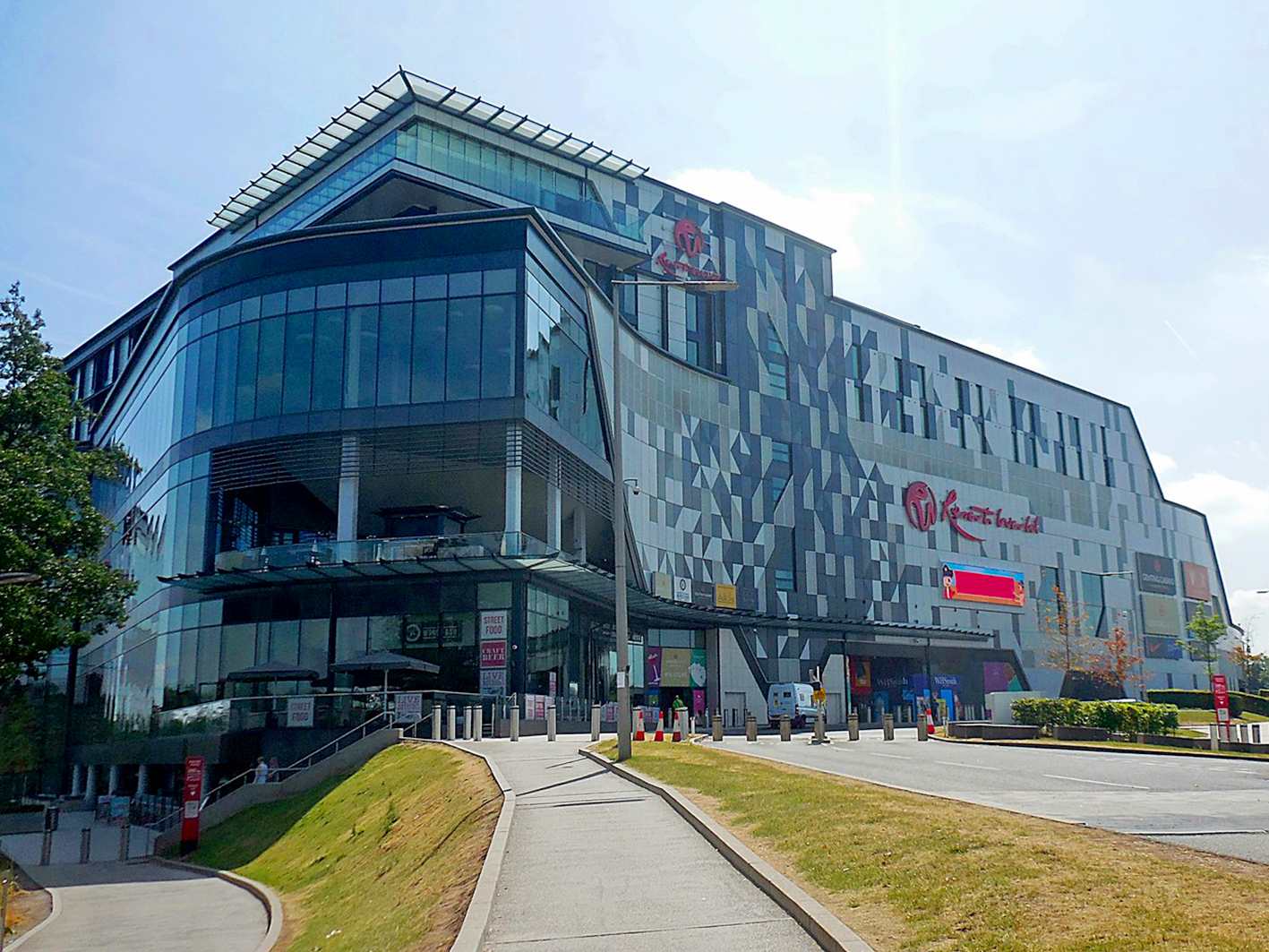
- Interactive map of Resorts World Birmingham
- Location: Birmingham, England; 1 Pendigo Way, Birmingham B40 1PU; 52.4484°N 1.7182°W
- Opened: 21 October 2015; 11 years ago
- Theme: Chinese
- No. of rooms: 178 + 6 Suites
- Gaming space: 59,180 sq ft
- Signature attractions: Cineworld IMAX Cinema; Genting Casino; Santai Medispa; Shopping Mall; VOX Conference Centre; Lindt; Genting Hotel; Resorts World Arena
- Notable restaurants: Five Guys; TGIFridays; Las Iguanas; Nando's; Gourmet Burger Kitchen; Pizza Express; Miller & Carter; Wrapchic; Zizzi; Bars: High Line; The World Bar; The Sky Bar
- Casino type: Land-Based
- Owner: Genting Group
- Architect: Benoy
- Website: www.resortsworldbirmingham.co.uk

Resorts World Birmingham is an entertainment complex in Solihull, near Birmingham England. It has the largest casino in the United Kingdom, shopping mall, restaurants and cinemas. Construction began in February 2013 and finished in autumn 2015. The Casino is owned by Genting.

The £150 million development in the NEC encompasses 50 shops and 18 bars, as well as restaurants, a spa, a cinema and a four star hotel.

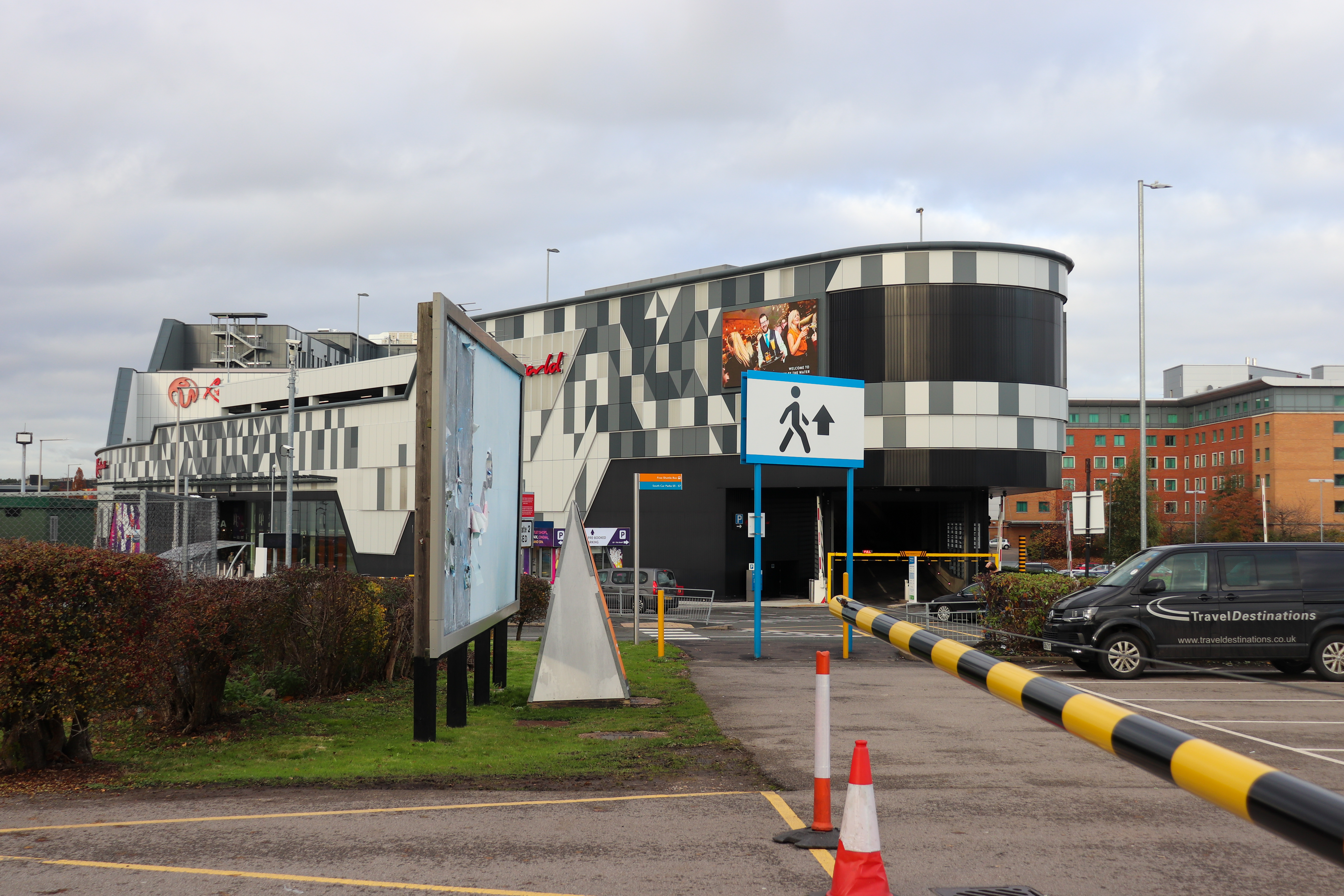
Resorts World Shopping and Leisure Complex

The complex (developed by Genting) is seven storeys high and spans 538,000 square feet (50,000 square meters). Its design is based on the shape of a cruise ship.

Resorts World Birmingham is the first Resorts World in Europe. The complex was predicted to boost the regional economy by £33 million per annum, and create 1,100 new jobs.

== Casino ==
Genting was awarded a large casino licence in June 2011 by Solihull Council, and granted planning permission in 2012. The casino, which takes up 11% of the overall site, is open 24 hours.

The games available include slot machines, roulette, black jack and other traditional casino games, along with poker rooms.

== Shopping and restaurants ==
The covered shopping village comprising 50 stores sits along two arcs at the base of Resorts World. Some of the shops are Ben Sherman, Carhartt, Hallmark Cards, Kurt Geiger, Levi's, Lindt, Next, Nike, Skechers, Sony, The North Face, The Works, Trespass, Vans, and WHSmith.

The facility also features a number of restaurants including Five Guys, TGIFridays, Zizzi, Las Iguanas, Nando's, Pizza Express and Miller & Carter. There are also coffee shops including Costa Coffee, and Starbucks (located inside cinema).

== Cinema and entertainment ==
The Cineworld cinema has a total of 1,782 seats and 11 screens. Eight out of the 11 screens have 3D capabilities.

The largest theatre has 282 seats, and marks the region's first purpose-built IMAX screen in a multiplex cinema. It is one of three IMAX screens in Birmingham.

Other entertainment includes a Hollywood Bowl and Escape Hunt, featuring interactive puzzles and escape rooms.

== Conference Centre ==
The Vox facility can hold 900 delegates or guests, and can be separated into five separate halls, for either ceremonies or conferences.

== bp pulse LIVE ==
The bp pulse LIVE (previously The NEC Arena, LG Arena, Genting Arena and Resorts World Arena) is part of the NEC and Resorts World complex.

== See also ==
- List of integrated resorts
