= Genting Casino Westcliff =

- Interactive map of Genting Casino Westcliff
- Location: Westcliff-on-Sea, Essex, England
- Casino type: Land-based
- Owner: Genting Group
- Coordinates: 51.5333°N 0.7021°E
- Website: Official website

Genting Casino Westcliff is a gambling establishment located on the Western Esplanade, Westcliff-on-Sea, Essex, England, on the seafront overlooking the Thames estuary.

== History ==
The original Westcliff and Waterfront Casinos were established in the 1970s and it was originally at the Mill House in Station Road. It opened at its present site, formerly an open-air swimming pool as part of The Westcliff Leisure Centre that opened in 1975. It has developed into the largest provincial casino and the second largest in Britain. The casino was first run by Brent Walker, and then by R J Bown Holdings. It was bought by Genting UK for an estimated £30,000,000.

The former open-air swimming pool is likely where musician Ian Dury contracted polio as a child.

The casino features many slots and Electronic Roulette terminals and twenty table games (single zero American Roulette, Baccarat, Three Card Poker, Blackjack and Two Way Texas Hold'em Poker) as well as a 120 cover restaurant overlooking the Thames Estuary.

Only a small part of the entire building is used by the public. The building itself actually descends three floors down.

In November 2007, the two sister casinos, "Spielers' Casino" and "Westcliff Casino", were refurbished by Genting Stanley to create the casinos named Southend Mint. Most recently in 2012, the casino underwent a multimillion-pound refurbishment and was renamed.

The first casino wedding in the United Kingdom took place at Southend. A player won £200,000 from the casino in 2010 taking him out of debt.

In November 2023, the casino had to close due to the discovery of reinforced autoclaved aerated concrete (RAAC), but work to rectify the problem was completed quickly and the casino re-opened two weeks later.
