= Steelman Partners =

American international architectural firm

- Company type: Partnership
- Industry: Architecture
- Founded: 1987, in Las Vegas, Nevada
- Founder: Paul Curtis Steelman
- Headquarters: Las Vegas, Nevada, U.S
- Number of locations: 6 offices in 5 countries
- Area served: Worldwide
- Key people: Paul Curtis Steelman, CEO; Steve Anderson, President
- Services: Architecture; Master Planning; Interior Design; Lighting Design; Brand Design; Architectural rendering
- Revenue: US $48.34 million (2015)
- Number of employees: 250
- Website: www.steelmanpartners.com

Steelman Partners is an American international architecture and interior design firm specializing in entertainment architecture, interior design, lighting design, graphic design, 3D design, and master planning. The firm has designed casinos and integrated resorts around the world.

== Staff ==
Steelman Partners has 250 employees worldwide including 150 in their Southern Nevada headquarters.

== Founding ==
Paul Curtis Steelman was employed by Wasleski Steelman, the city of Atlantic City, the Golden Nugget, and MGM Mirage companies after graduating from Clemson University in 1977. In 1987, he founded his own firm, Paul Steelman Ltd. Architect. The name of the company is now Steelman Partners, LLP.

== Notable Projects ==
- Beau Rivage
- Black Hawk Casino
- Caesars Gauteng
- Caesars Republic Sonoma County
- Casino Gran Via
- Casino Helsinki
- Circa Resort & Casino
- The Darling Gold Coast
- First Light Resort and Casino
- Galaxy International Convention Center
- Galaxy Macau Phase II
- Galaxy Sky 88 Casino
- Gila River Santan Mountain
- Graceland Hotel
- Grand Ho Tram Strip
- Hard Rock Biloxi
- Imperial Pacific Resort and Hotel
- Inspire Korea Entertainment Resort
- Jupiters Gold Coast
- LVXP Las Vegas
- Metropolitan Casino London Mayfair
- NagaWorld Cambodia
- Naga 2 at NagaWorld Cambodia
- Naga 3 at NagaWorld Cambodia
- The Playground in Atlantic City
- Resorts World Las Vegas
- Sands Macau
- Skyline Las Vegas
- Sochi Casino & Resort
- Solaire Resort & Casino
- The Star Gold Coast
- Steel Pier
- Sunseeker Resort
- Thunder Valley Casino & Resort
- Treasure Island Expansions & Renovations

Sands Macau designed by Steelman Partners

== Affiliated Companies ==
- Shop12 - Lighting Design
- Marqi Branding Studio- Branding
- Competition Interactive - Skill-Based Casino Game Development
