= Lim Goh Tong =

Malaysian Chinese businessman and entrepreneur

Yang Berbahagia Tan Sri Dato' Seri Lim Goh Tong PSM SPMP SIMP DPMS
- 林梧桐
- Born: 28 February 1918; Anxi County, Fujian, China
- Died: 23 October 2007 (aged 89); Subang Jaya, Selangor, Malaysia
- Occupations: Entrepreneur and businessman
- Spouse: Lee Kim Hua
- Children: 6 including Lim Kok Thay

Lim Goh Tong (Chinese: 林梧桐; pinyin: Lín Wútóng; Pe̍h-ōe-jī: Lîm Ngô͘-tông; 28 February 1918 – 23 October 2007) was a prominent wealthy Malaysian Chinese businessman and entrepreneur. He was the founder of Genting Highlands and renowned for transforming the resort from an unexplored hilltop into one of the world's most successful casino resorts. According to Forbes, he was once the third richest man in Malaysia, with a net worth of US$4.3 billion.

== Early life ==
Born in 1918 in Anxi, a mountainous county in southeastern Fujian province, China, Lim Goh Tong was the fifth child in his family. He had an elder brother (Jing Ya), three elder sisters (Lim Zhuang, Lim Bau and Lim See), a younger sister (Lim Mei) and a younger brother (Jing Kun). Lim was born into a rustic environment in a village. During that time, China was in a period of turmoil and unrest after the 1911 revolution, but life was relatively sheltered for Lim in the village. He grew up peacefully and had the opportunity of studying in school. However, disaster struck and his father died when he was 16. Lim was forced to leave school and he and his elder brother had to take over the heavy burden of feeding his family.

As China's situation was becoming worse, Lim Goh Tong decided to take the plunge in venturing out to Malaysia (known as Malaya at that time) following in his cousin, Lim Kheng Chong's footsteps. He left China through Xiamen in early February 1937 at the age of 19. He worked for his uncle as a carpenter in the first two years, learning the Malay language in the meantime. After gaining experience, he went on to become a building sub-contractor and completed his first job of building a two-storey school. He returned to Anxi in 1940, but went back to Malaya the next year amidst a deteriorating war environment.

== Career and business ==
The Japanese invaded Malaya in 1942 and caused Lim to have a few near-death experiences. During the early Japanese Occupation, he earned a living as a vegetable farmer but decided to switch to petty trading for a better living. Later on, Lim ventured into scrap-metal and hardware trading. When the Japanese Occupation ended, there was an urgent demand for heavy machinery for resumed operations in mines and rubber plantations. Lim seized the opportunity and engaged in second-hand machinery trading, making his first fortune.

From used machinery trading, Lim strayed into iron mining, joining as a partner in an iron mining company which couldn't settle the outstanding payment of two bulldozers with him. This proved to be a successful venture, and he later went on to form a joint-venture company which was one of the first Chinese tin companies to utilise dredges.

While dealing in heavy machinery, Lim accumulated a wide range of reconditioned machines as well as a substantial amount of cash to move into construction and related industries. In the name of his family construction company, Kien Huat Private Limited, Lim began taking on several contracting jobs with help and guidance from his uncles. Kien Huat won accolades and became recognised as one of the leading construction companies, building the Ayer Itam Dam and the Kemubu Irrigation Scheme.

=== Developing Genting Resort ===
Genting Group's involvement in the property sector can be traced from the initial primary objective of holding land-based assets for long term appreciation and development potential to the current strategic move to develop and market the Group's landed properties mainly held in the plantation subsidiary, by Asiatic Land Development Sdn Bhd, a wholly owned subsidiary of Genting Plantations Berhad – which is 54.8% owned by Genting Berhad.

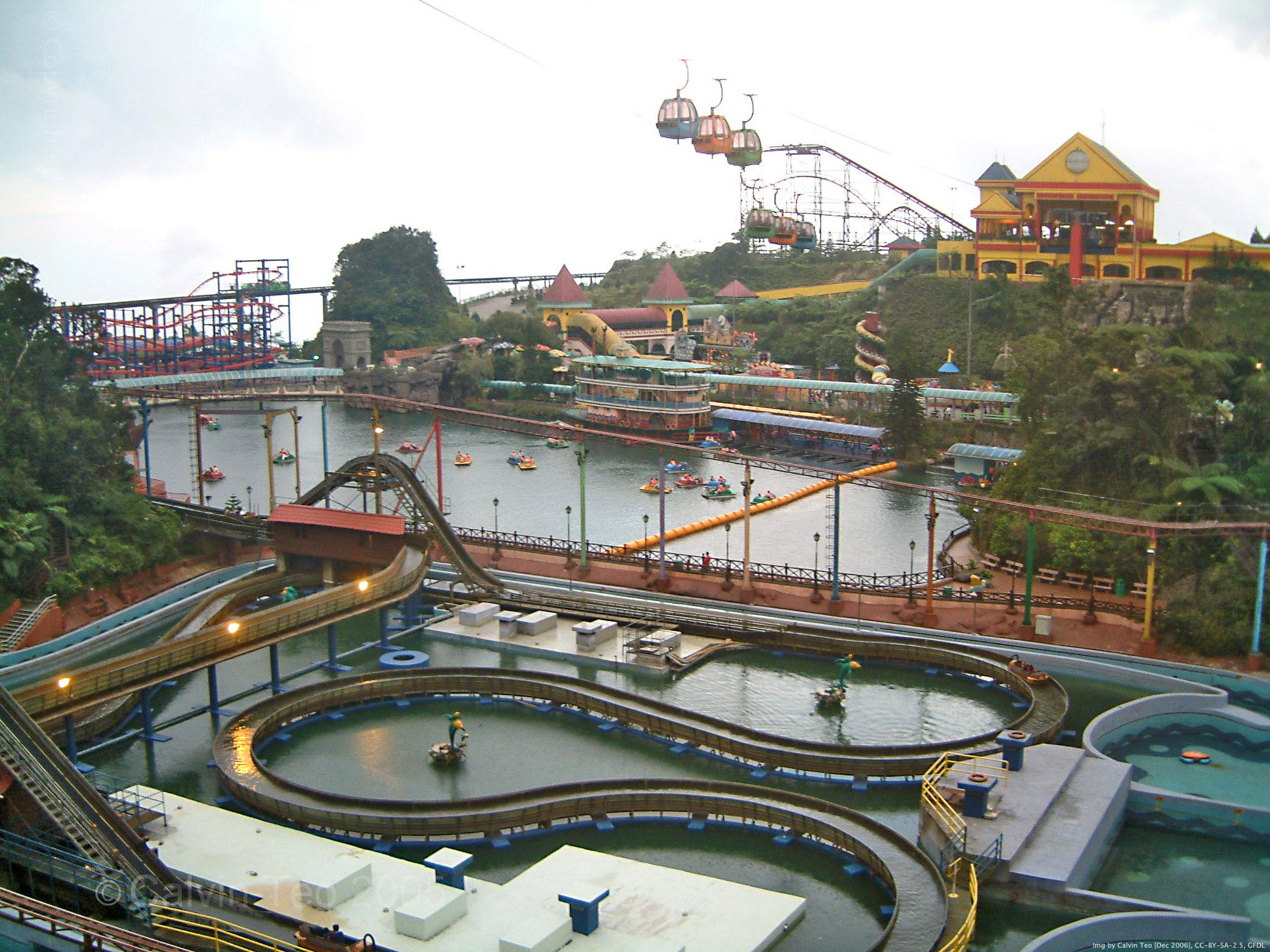
The Genting Highlands Theme Park

The idea of building a hilltop resort was first conceived when Lim Goh Tong was having dinner in Cameron Highlands. As he was enjoying the soothing cool breeze of Cameron Highlands, an idea struck him that as the standard of living rose steadily in Malaysia, more and more people would visit mountain resorts for relaxation and recreation, but Cameron Highlands was too far away from the capital city Kuala Lumpur, therefore building a mountain resort nearer to Kuala Lumpur would have great business potential.

After doing some research, Lim found Gunung (mountain in Malay) Ulu Kali at a place called Genting Sempah to be an ideal location for his plan. He formed an expedition and explored the place, collecting a wealth of data on the topography, drainage, soil conditions and other relevant aspects of the region, which proved to be very useful in drawing up plans for developing the resort.

Upon conceiving this idea, many naysayers were sceptical of Lim turning a wilderness into a tourist resort. Most thought it was really risky and reckoned Lim who was financially comfortable to be foolish to invest heavily in money and time to develop Genting, but Lim brushed off all these negativities and went ahead firmly with his plan.

After getting approvals from the Federal and State governments, Lim began the project in the face of a colossal task. Among the problems were building the access road towards the hilltop, water and electricity supplies, sewerage system and fire safety. Lim managed to build the access road towards the summit in three years when it was estimated to take fifteen years. Several sources of water in the mountain were identified and supply was secured by building water-collection stations and water filtration plants with treated water stored in reservoirs. Electricity is supplied through a central electricity generation system with 12 big generators.

During the construction, Lim survived six close brushes with death. Meanwhile, Lim had to administer another major project in Kelantan, the Kemubu Irrigation Scheme at the same time. This stretched his physical endurance to the limits as he had to shuttle between Kuala Lumpur and Kelantan and he worked seven days a week.

During the Genting project, Lim spent all he had without earning any income. He sold an 810-hectare rubber estate to raise RM2.5 million. In addition, he invested all the money he had made from iron mining, sub-contracting and hardware businesses. The project was a heavy drain on Lim's finances. When asked to invest in this project, Lim's friends turned him down and counselled him to drop the entire scheme instead.

Genting was granted the only casino licence after Tunku Abdul Rahman, then Prime Minister of Malaysia, visited Genting Highlands and commended Lim's effort to develop a resort contributing to Malaysia's tourism industry without government help.

Lim managed to obtain a pioneer status for Genting Highlands and tax incentives despite its resort development not qualifying for it. He did so by convincing the government that tax incentives in the early stage of development of Genting Highlands were not only vital for them but also profitable to the government later on.

The whole Genting project was completed in January 1971, but prior to officially commencing business, Kuala Lumpur and its surrounding areas were hit by the worst rainstorms in a century, the road to Genting was closed by landslides at 180 locations, the damaged sections took four months to repair. Genting opened its door for business on 8 May 1971.

In the next 30 years, Lim continued to develop and expand Genting Highlands beyond its original idea of a hotel with basic tourist facilities to an integrated resort. Among the projects was the construction of more hotels, indoor and outdoor theme parks, and a convention centre. A new road was built to shorten the journey to Genting from the northern states, and RM920 million was invested to widen a 10 km stretch of the access road to reduce congestion. Another RM928 million was spent on constructing a cable car system to provide visitors with an alternative mode of transportation.

In 1993, at the suggestion of Prime Minister Mahathir Mohamad, a township was developed on an 81-hectare piece of land around the site of the Genting Skyway cable car station. It was named Gohtong Jaya after Lim as a token of remembrance for his efforts in the development of Genting Highlands.

As of now, Genting Highlands is one of the most successful Casino resorts in the world and is one of the primary tourist attractions in Malaysia. Lim's company, Genting Group operates Genting Highlands and has diversified into many other industries such as plantations, property, paper, power generation, oil and gas exploration and cruise boat industries. In the process new company brands were created that have become distinctive names in their respective fields, namely Asiatic, Genting Sanyen (paper manufacturing) and Star Cruises.

On 31 December 2003, Lim handed his chairmanship of Genting Group over to his son, Tan Sri Lim Kok Thay.

== Personal life ==
Lim Goh Tong was married to Lee Kim Hua in 1944, together they had six children and nineteen grandchildren. The six children are Lim Siew Lay, Siew Lian, Siew Kim, Tee Keong, Kok Thay and Chee Wah.

Throughout his life, Lim has had a few medical crises including malignant tumour and cardiovascular problems, which he pulled through after several surgeries.

Lim wrote his autobiography My Story – Lim Goh Tong and it was published in 2004. In the book, he wrote about his early life, how he started off with nothing to building a world-class casino resort through hard work and perseverance confounding sceptics, and the people he acknowledges.

Ten years after Goh Tong's death, on 25 August 2017, his wife Kim Hua died at the age of 88.

== Achievement and awards ==
Lim Goh Tong had won many awards together with his company Genting Group for his entrepreneurship and his contribution such as:

- Malaysian Entrepreneurs Award 1985
- Manager of the Year Award 1986
- Business Achiever of the Year Award1994
- Number 1 ranking of 10 Malaysian Leading Companies 1999
- The Best Employer Award 1996

In 1978 Lim Goh Tong set up Yayasan Lim, a family foundation that donates regularly to educational and medical institutions, old folk's homes, various organisations for the physically handicapped and other charitable causes.

== Honours ==
- Malaysia
  - Commander of the Order of Loyalty to the Crown of Malaysia (PSM) – Tan Sri (1979)
- Pahang
  - Knight Grand Companion of the Order of the Crown of Pahang (SIMP) – formerly Dato', now Dato' Indera (1987)
- Perak
  - Knight Grand Commander of the Order of the Perak State Crown (SPMP) – Dato' Seri (1989)
- Selangor
  - Knight Commander of the Order of the Crown of Selangor (DPMS) – Dato' (1980)

== Death ==
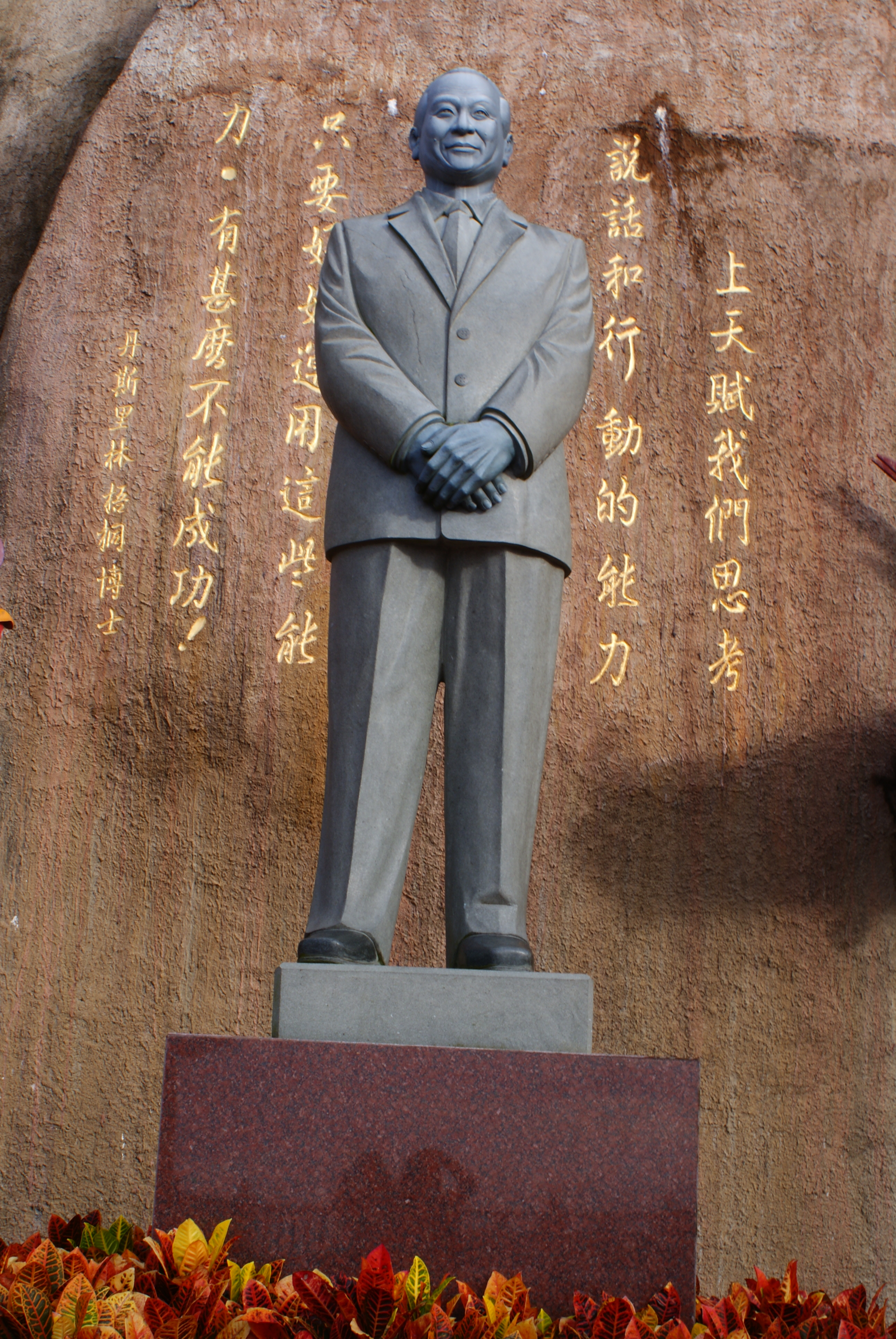
Statue of Lim Goh Tong at Chin Swee Caves Temple

Lim Goh Tong died on 23 October 2007, at Subang Jaya Medical Centre (SJMC) in Subang Jaya. He is survived by his wife Puan Sri Lee Kim Hua, and their six children and 19 grandchildren. His body was buried at Gohtong Memorial Park at Gohtong Jaya on Monday 29 October 2007.

- The Black Eyed Peas who were performing on the night of 26 October in Genting Arena of Stars paid tribute to Lim Goh Tong during their concert. "A man died recently who was responsible for the place where we are today. I'd like to ask for a moment of silence to honour his life and legacy," will.i.am said in his tribute.

More than 20,000 people, including royalty, Asia's rich and famous, politicians, friends, business allies and members of the public paid tribute to Goh Tong in their own ways. They either attended the wake, sent wreaths or penned messages of sympathy.

Among those who paid their respects to Lim were

- Tengku Puan Pahang Tunku Azizah Aminah Maimunah Iskandariah Sultan Iskandar
- Tun Dr. Siti Hasmah, wife of Tun Dr. Mahathir Mohamad
- Dato' Seri Abdullah Ahmad Badawi, Prime Minister of Malaysia
- Tun Musa Hitam, former Deputy Prime Minister of Malaysia
- Dato' Seri Ong Ka Ting, Minister of Housing and Local Government of Malaysia and President of the Malaysian Chinese Association (MCA)
- Tun Mohammed Hanif Omar and wife Toh Puan Hamidah Abdul Hamid, former Inspector-General of Police (Malaysia) and Deputy Chairman of Genting Group and Resorts World Bhd
- Tan Sri Dr. Saleha Mohd Ali, sister-in-law of Tun Dr. Mahathir Mohamad
- Tan Sri Dato' Seri Yeoh Tiong Lay and wife Puan Sri Tan Kai Yong, Group Chairman of YTL Corporation
- Datin Paduka Marina Mahathir, daughter of Tun Dr. Mahathir Mohamad
- Dato' Indera Nazir Razak, Chief Executive Officer (CEO) of CIMB Group
- Puan Sri Christine Khir Johari
- Vincent Cheng, Chairman of The Hongkong and Shanghai Banking Corporation (HSBC)
- Irene Dorner, CEO of HSBC Bank Malaysia
- Michael Thomas, Chairman of Foxwoods Resort Casino Tribal

More than 1000 wreaths received from all over the world are being displayed 300m along the entrance of Gohtong Villa. Among the many corporate entities sent wreaths and condolences included Las Vegas Caesars Palace, Sociedade de Turismo e Diversões de Macau, Stanley Ho, and the Government of Fujian province where Lim was born. Asia's second-richest man, Li Ka Shing (He is now first), sent a personal condolence note to the bereaved family, offering words that perhaps best captured the essence of who Goh Tong was.

=== Words of farewell ===
"Genting is really a story of Tan Sri Lim Goh Tong, a story of success that is quite unprecedented even in Malaysia, where many people have met with a great deal of success" - Tun Dr Mahathir Mohamad in his speech during the Genting 25th Anniversary Celebrations on August 11, 1990

"Tan Sri Lim's ingenuity, single-mindedness and dauntless courage in meeting challenges have enabled him to rise from humble beginning to great heights of attainment" - Tun Dr Mahathir Mohamad in his foreword in Lim's autobiography "My Story published in 2004

"From harvesting lettuce and maple syrup, we have now become the most profitable resorts in the world. Before Lim, we only knew poverty. It was with his faith and trust that we are what we are now." – Michael Thomas, chairman of the Native American Mashantucket Pequot Tribal Nation.

"He was a good man. He also understood that he needed to repay society after benefiting from it." – Dr Tan Tat Chin, a member of the Tung Shin Hospital board of directors.

"He is a source of inspiration and we salute his accomplishment. He will continue to live in the heart of those who have been touched by him." – Tan Sri Dr Ng Lay Swee, president and chief executive officer of Universiti Tunku Abdul Rahman.

== See also ==
- Genting Highlands
- Genting Group
- List of billionaires
