= Park Lane Mews Hotel =

Hotel in Mayfair, London

Coordinates: 51.5061°N 0.1490°W

Park Lane Mews Hotel in 2011

The Park Lane Mews Hotel (formerly the Hilton London Mews Hotel) is a luxury 4-star boutique hotel in London's Mayfair district.

== History of the hotel ==
The building, which dates back to 1618, was originally the site of a shepherd's cottage – known as Mayfair's oldest house. During the Blitz, in the winter of 1940, the cottage was destroyed when a bomb struck a building opposite.

A plaque above the hotel reads:

"On this site, until destroyed by bombing during the winter of 1940, stood an archway and Mayfair's oldest house. ‘The Cottage 1618 A.D.' from where a shepherd tended his flock whilst Tyburn idled nearby.”

The hotel building has been updated a number of times over the years.

== About the hotel building ==
The Park Lane Mews Hotel, a 4-star London hotel, is a small hotel in the townhouse style.

The hotel is owned by Genting Group, who also own the largest number of casinos in the UK, including 4 casinos in London: Crockfords, Palm Beach, Maxims and Colony Club.

The hotel has seven floors: five floors of bedrooms and suites; the ground floor which hosts the lounge bar, restaurant and reception area; and a basement with offices and conference rooms.
