= Resorts World Las Vegas =

Casino resort in Winchester, Nevada, US

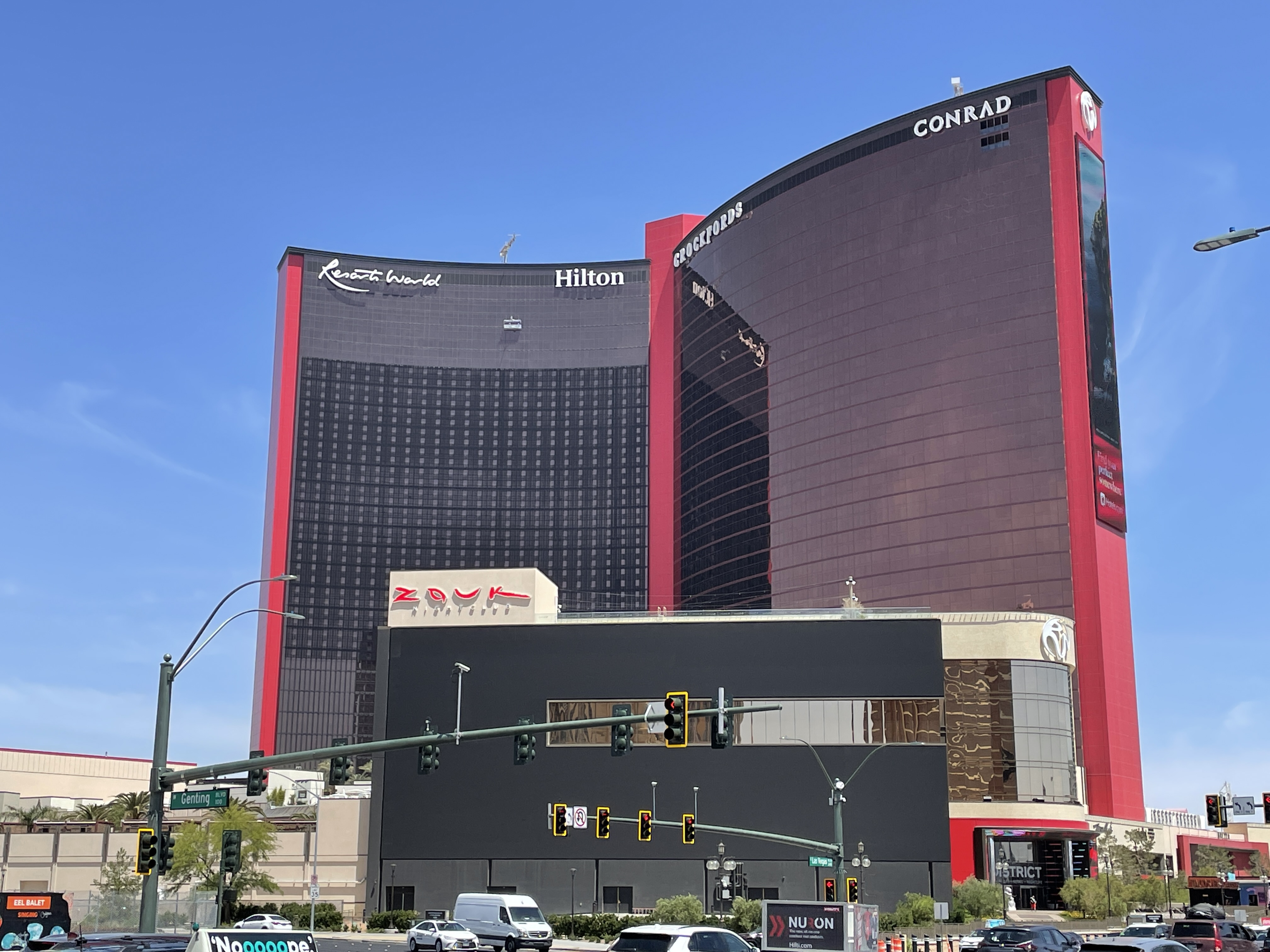
- Resorts World Las Vegas, May 2022

- Location within Las Vegas Strip Location within Nevada
- Interactive map of Resorts World Las Vegas
- Location: Winchester, Nevada, U.S.; 3000 South Las Vegas Boulevard; 36°8′2″N 115°10′4″W
- Opened: June 24, 2021; 5 years ago
- Theme: East Asian
- No. of rooms: 3,506
- Gaming space: 117,000 sq ft (10,900 m^{2})
- Notable restaurants: Carversteak; Crossroads Kitchen; Fuhu; Stubborn Seed
- Casino type: Land-based
- Owner: Genting Group
- Architect: Steelman Partners
- Website: rwlasvegas.com

Resorts World Las Vegas is a luxury resort and casino on the Las Vegas Strip in Winchester, Nevada, United States. It is owned and operated by Genting Group as part of the Resorts World brand.

Opened on June 24, 2021, it is the first new resort to be completed on the Las Vegas Strip since the Cosmopolitan opened in 2010. At a cost of $4.3 billion, Resorts World is the most expensive resort property ever developed in Las Vegas. It includes a 117,000 sq ft (10,900 m^{2}) casino and a 59-story tower housing 3,506 rooms in three Hilton hotels: Las Vegas Hilton at Resorts World, with 1,678 rooms; Conrad Las Vegas at Resorts World, with 1,496 rooms; and Crockfords Las Vegas, with 332 rooms.

The resort also has restaurants and entertainment venues, including several by Zouk Group. The 5,000-seat Resorts World Theatre has one of the largest stages on the Strip. Other features include a 70,000 sq ft (6,500 m^{2}) retail center; a five-acre pool complex; and a station for the Las Vegas Convention Center Loop, an underground shuttle service. Resorts World features a 100,000-square-foot LED screen which makes it the second largest video screen in the world.

== History ==
=== Background ===
In 2007, Boyd Gaming demolished its Stardust Resort and Casino on the northern Las Vegas Strip to develop Echelon Place, a mixed-use project, but construction was halted during the economic downturn of 2008. Four years later, Boyd began months-long negotiations to sell the 87-acre (35 ha) site to Genting Group, based in Malaysia. The $350 million sale was finalized on March 4, 2013. On the same day, as part of its Resorts World brand, Genting announced plans to build the Chinese-themed Resorts World Las Vegas on the site, while using some of the unfinished Echelon buildings for the new project.

Before purchasing the property, Genting had considered building a resort on the former nearby site of the New Frontier Hotel and Casino. Genting ultimately chose the Echelon site for its size, location, and the fact that it already included some partially built structures, which would shorten the project's construction period. Echelon's foundations and incomplete hotel tower, as well as an unfinished Echelon parking garage on the property's southwest corner, would be incorporated into the new resort. The project was expected to revitalize the northern portion of the Strip, although some analysts were concerned that the local hotel market had already been saturated, with more than 150,000 rooms. Genting paid $4 million per acre for the site, down from previous years when land on the Strip sometimes sold for a minimum of $17 million per acre.

=== Early work ===
Genting was known to proceed slowly and quietly on some of its projects, as it did with Resorts World Las Vegas. Much of the final design work and planning was done privately. Early plans called for the project to be developed in phases over several years, with numerous hotel towers at full buildout. Groundbreaking was originally scheduled for 2014, with the first phase set to open in 2016. Genting expected to spend between $2 billion and $7 billion to complete the entire project. The first phase was eventually budgeted at $4 billion, a quarter of which was to be financed by foreign investors through the EB-5 program. The first phase would consist of the main hotel tower, and the project would also include retail and convention space.

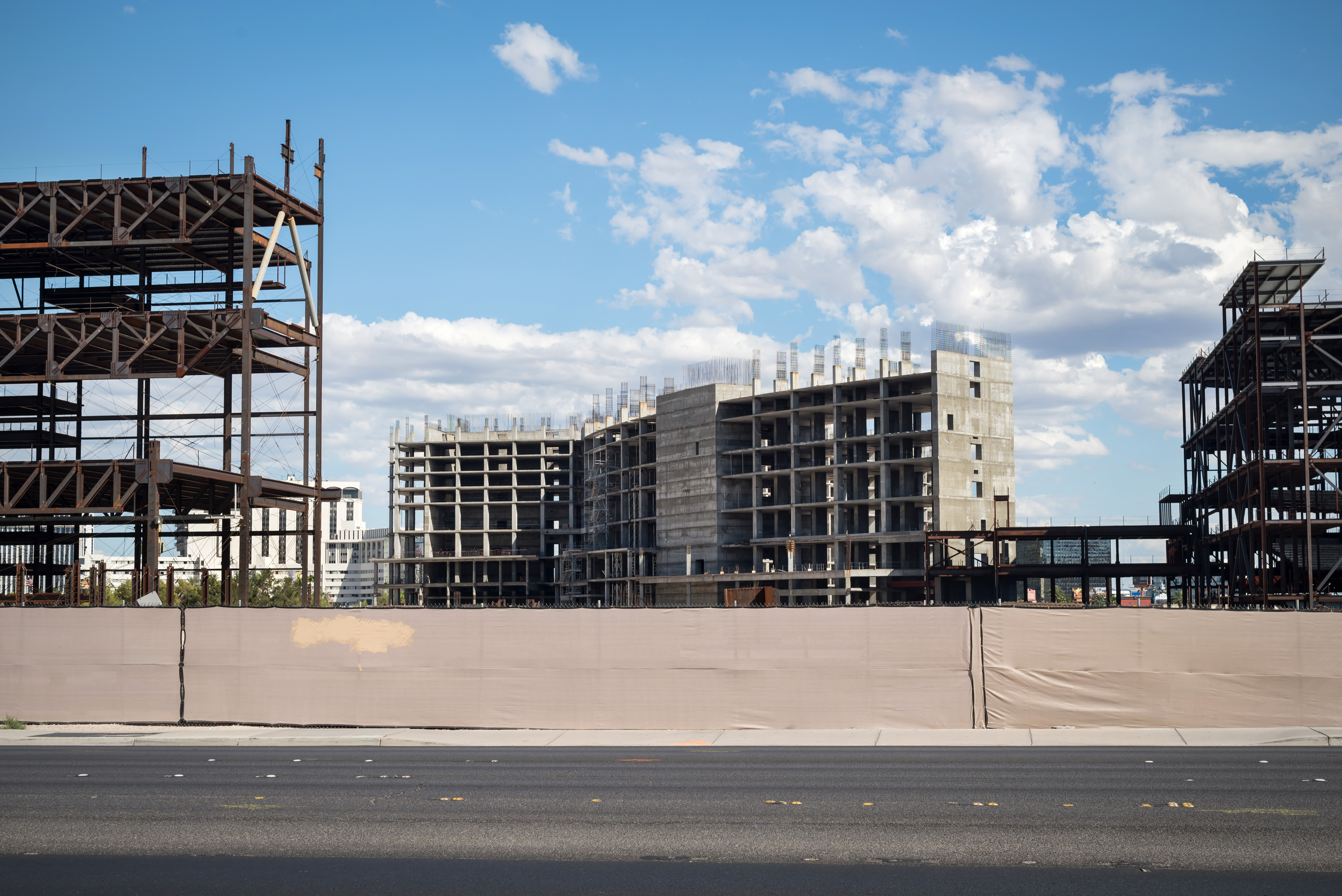
The future Resorts World hotel tower, seen in September 2015

Genting delayed the 2014 groundbreaking to continue finalizing designs for the project, with the first phase now expected to open in late 2017. The groundbreaking ceremony took place on May 5, 2015, with a revised opening date of mid-2018. The ceremony featured lion dancers, and was attended by approximately 250 people, including Nevada governor Brian Sandoval, lieutenant governor Mark Hutchison, U.S. Representative Cresent Hardy, Clark County Commissioners Steve Sisolak and Chris Giunchigliani, and Steve and Elaine Wynn. The project had approximately 100 construction workers engaged in site preparation, working in the mornings and at night to avoid the summer heat.

In October 2015, workers topped off half of the parking structure originally meant for Echelon. Up to that time, Genting had spent more than $50 million on construction and other work, such as property maintenance. Little construction had occurred up to that time, as Genting was awaiting various permits, including those needed for energy, sewer and water systems. In the meantime, the company continued to develop its plans for the rest of the project. Genting spokesman Michael Levoff stated that Resorts World Las Vegas was "one of the most cutting-edge and ambitious projects to be undertaken in the Las Vegas Strip in the last decade. A $4 billion project will not be built overnight; it requires a rigorous planning and approval process."

Work on the parking garage continued as of February 2016, but construction was otherwise non-existent, expected to begin later in the year. The resort was rescheduled to open in early 2019, with the delay attributed to ongoing design work. Other factors were struggles with the devaluation of Malaysian currency and in the Chinese economy.

By July 2016, Genting was finalizing designs for the hotel tower and the casino floor, ahead of plans to complete foundation work. Construction cranes were expected to be placed at the site in early 2017, but their unavailability delayed the start of construction. In May 2017, the resort's opening was delayed to 2020, after the project was redesigned to attract younger gamblers. The parking garage had already been finished, and was to be used by the eventual 5,000 construction workers. Resort president Edward Farrell said the design phase was nearing its end and that, "We've done a lot of construction that nobody has seen over the last two or three years — not exciting stuff, like utility lines, working out easements and building a garage with some office space." Upcoming construction would focus on the hotel tower and the casino structure.

=== Primary construction ===
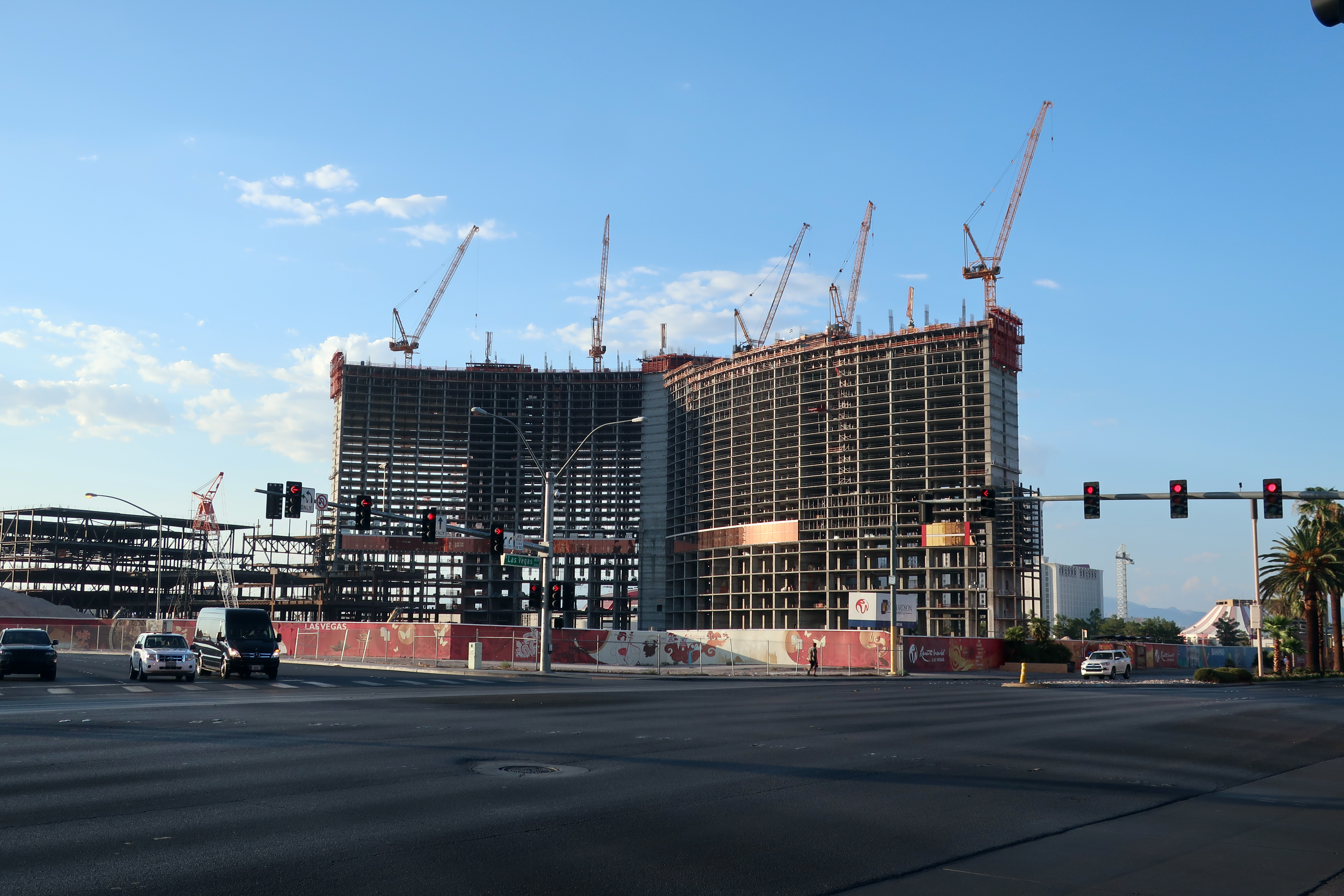
Resorts World tower during construction, August 2018

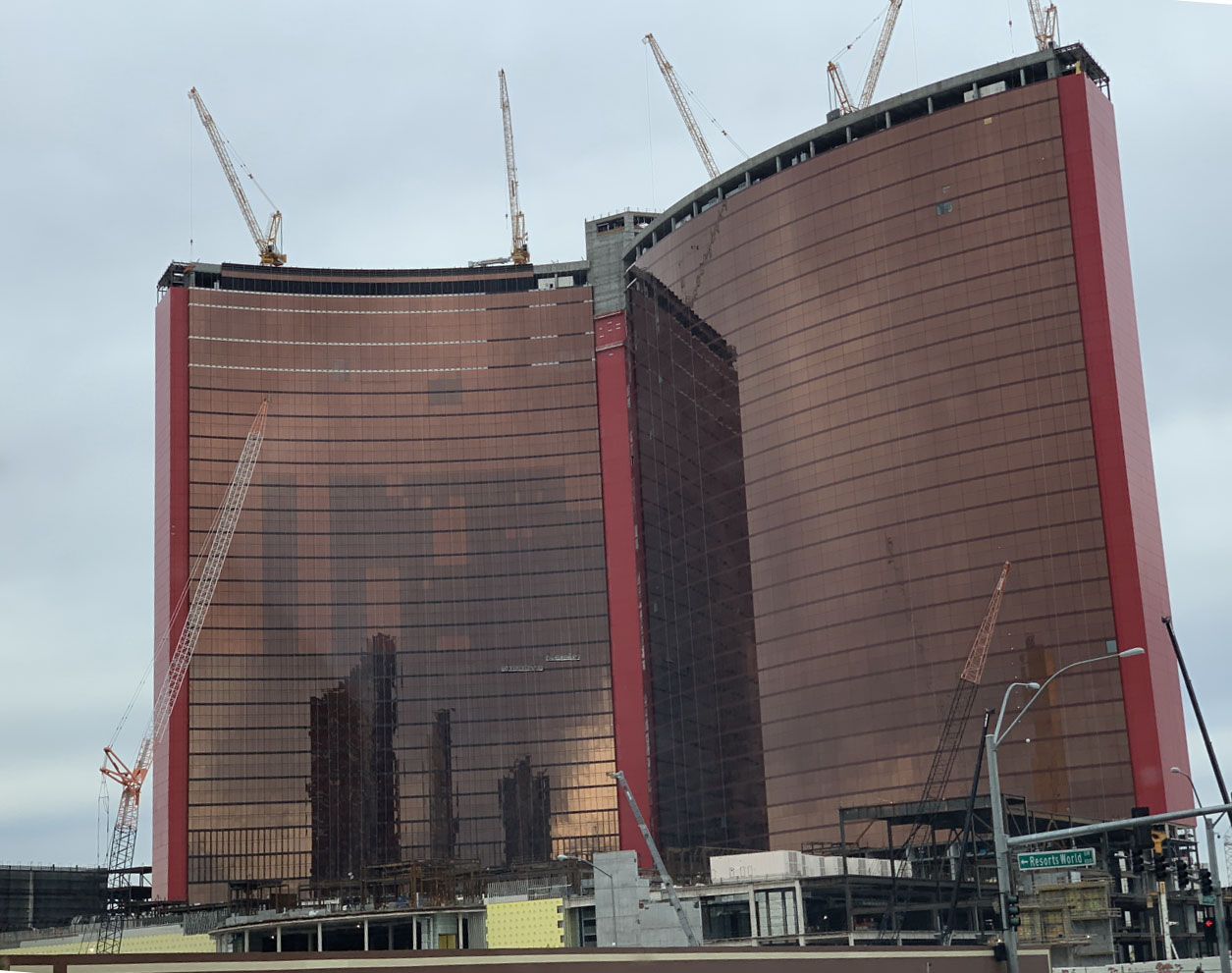
Tower in December 2019

In October 2017, W.A. Richardson Builders was announced as construction manager. That month, demolition began on some steel beams and concrete left from the Echelon project that would not be used for Resorts World. Construction began in late 2017. Within a year, the project had reached the 35th floor. More than 1,000 construction workers were engaged in steel, concrete, and glasswork throughout the site. The 59-story tower was topped off in mid-August 2019.

In November 2019, Genting announced that the opening would be again delayed until summer 2021, due to upgraded plans for the resort; these changes increased the project's cost from $4 billion to $4.3 billion, making it the most expensive resort property ever developed in Las Vegas.

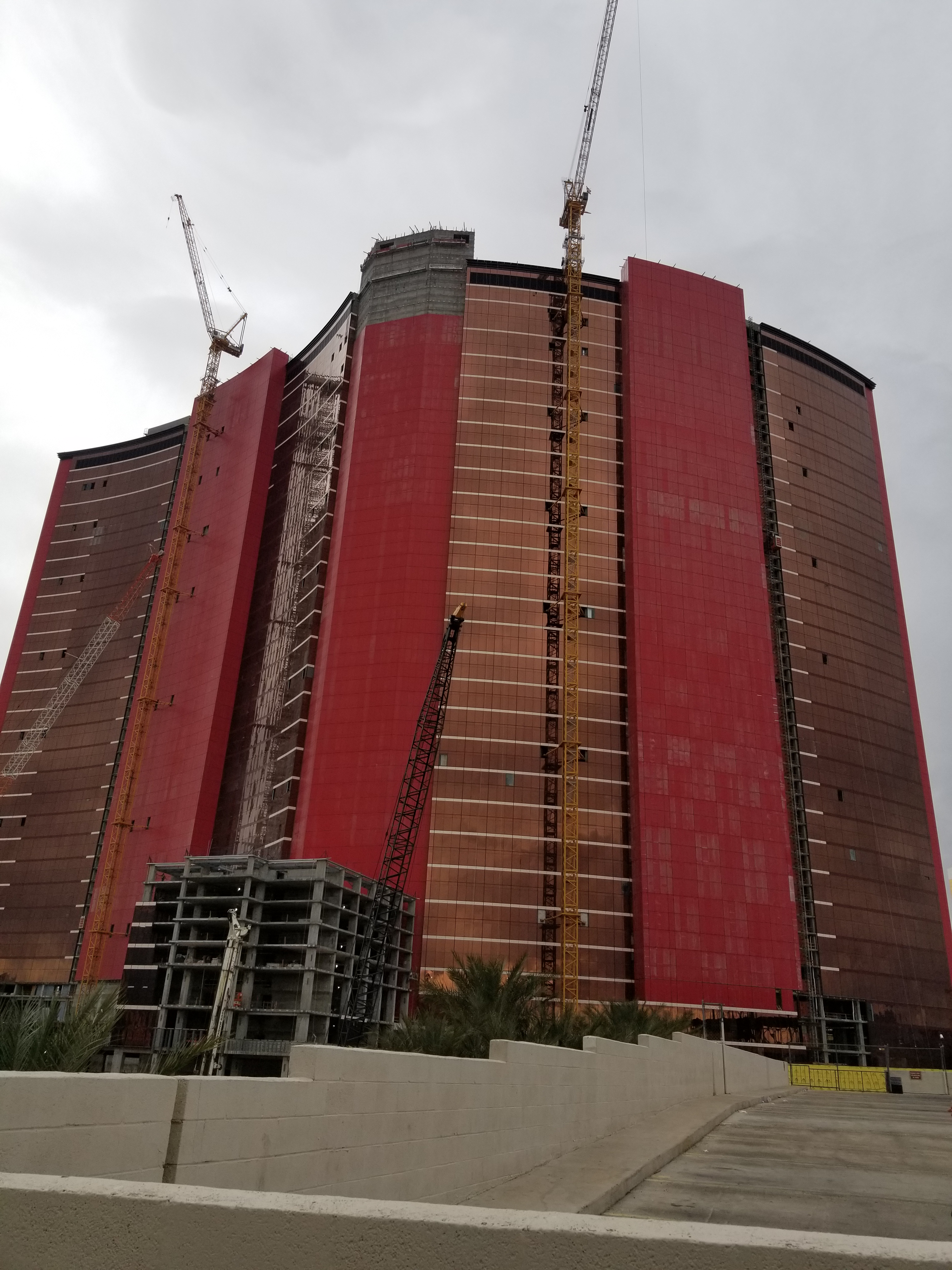
The tower's north side, March 2020

While a 4,000-seat theater had been planned at one point, the increased budget included new plans for a 5,000-seat venue, in addition to a 75,000 sq ft (7,000 m^{2}) nightclub and day club for a younger demographic, and 100 additional hotel rooms for a total of 3,500. More convention space was also added to the design, along with a pool complex.

In February 2020, it was announced that Resorts World had partnered with Hilton Hotels. Through the deal, a portion of the hotel would be branded as Hilton, while other areas would be marketed under two of Hilton's other brands, LXR Hotels and Conrad Hotels. The Hilton name would provide brand recognition and help attract guests to the resort, as Genting had few U.S. properties by comparison.

The COVID-19 pandemic occurred in 2020, having various effects in Nevada. At least seven construction workers at Resorts World tested positive for COVID-19, and various safety precautions were put in place to protect workers from contracting the virus. The pandemic also created some difficulty in acquiring building materials. Although construction slowed down, the project was still expected to open on time. Resorts World was 65% completed as of June 2020, and reached 90% in March 2021.

=== Opening and early years ===
A VIP party was held for invited guests on the night of June 24, 2021, followed by the public opening at 11:00 p.m. Opening ceremonies included a fireworks show, and a lion and dragon dance. The opening night attracted 20,000 people, including 5,500 at the VIP party. Celebrities were among people who attended the opening. The hotel opened the next day, and a grand opening celebration took place during the Fourth of July weekend, with Miley Cyrus performing. The resort opened with 95 percent of its amenities, excluding features such as the theater, a spa, and a nightclub.

The property is the first new resort to be completed on the Las Vegas Strip since the Cosmopolitan, which opened in 2010. Resorts World was expected to employ approximately 6,000 people. Because of high unemployment caused by the pandemic, more than 130,000 people applied for jobs at the resort. The property is expected to help revitalize the northern Strip, where several large projects had failed to materialize. A third of the resort's 88-acre site was left vacant for possible expansion, including land on the south and northwest ends.

A few months after opening, Resorts World partnered with Hotels.com to feature the latter's Captain Obvious character in an advertising campaign for the property. In 2023, the property became one of the few Las Vegas resorts to be powered entirely by renewable energy.

In August 2024, the Nevada Gaming Control Board filed a disciplinary complaint against Resorts World, alleging that the casino welcomed illegal bookmaking, as well as people with gambling-related felony convictions and links to organized crime, and asking the Nevada Gaming Commission to issue a fine and take action against Resorts World's gaming license. The resort was fined $10 million in 2025—the second-largest fine ever levied in Nevada gaming history—for its failure to comply with federal anti-money laundering laws, notably, while under the direction of disgraced manager Scott Sibella, whose license was revoked in December 2024.

In June 2025, it emerged that Resorts World was looking to potentially build an NBA arena on the property if the NBA decides to expand to Las Vegas. Resorts World could also attempt to purchase neighboring Circus Circus Las Vegas.

In the summer of 2025, citing low hotel occupancy, Resorts World became the first property on the Las Vegas Strip to temporarily do away with resort fees.

== Design ==
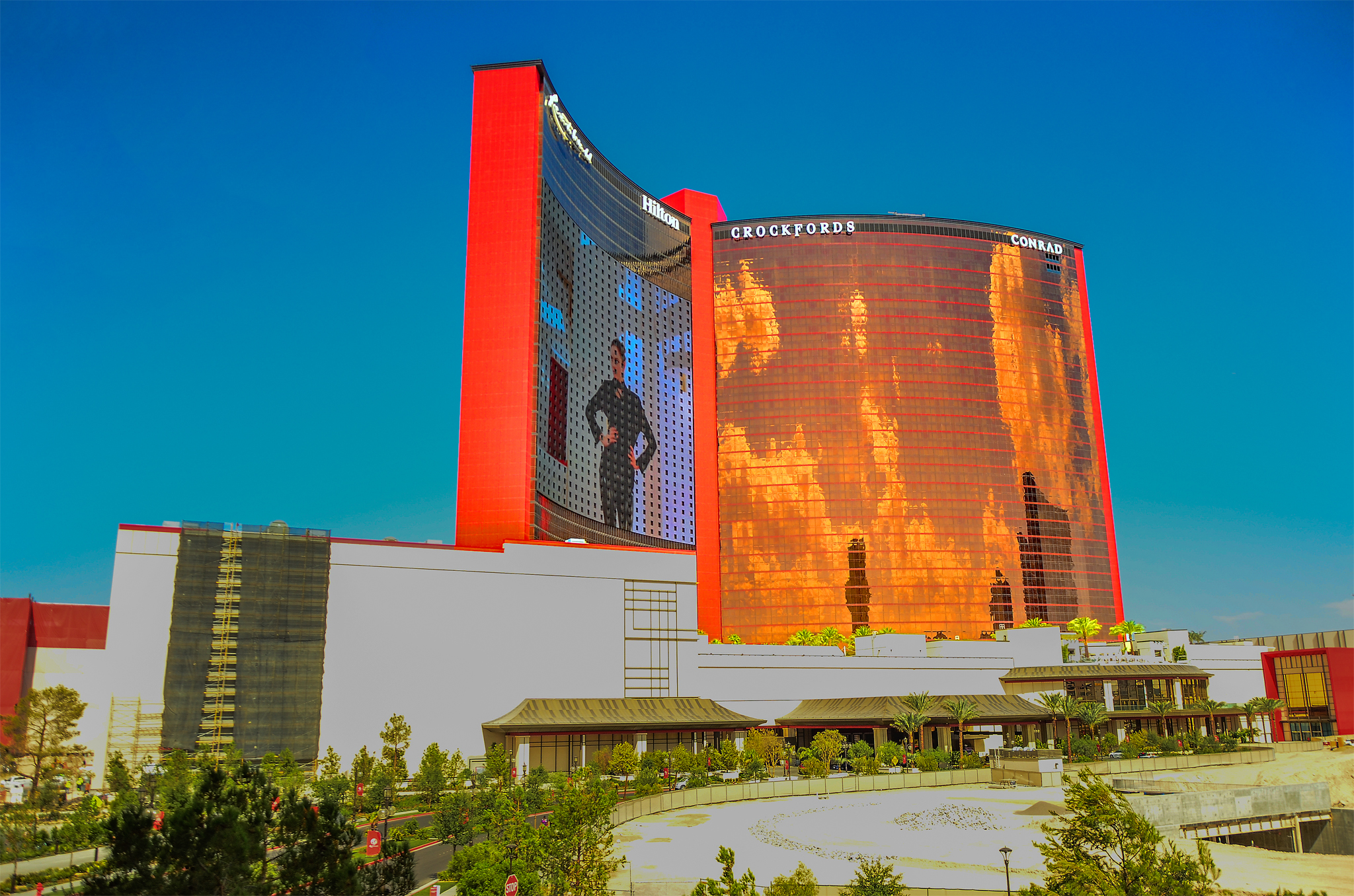
The reflection of the sun on the resort’s windows

Resorts World Las Vegas was designed by Paul Steelman's architectural firm, Steelman Partners. The final design was influenced by Asian culture; early plans had focused heavier on this, with several features eventually being scrapped. These included a replica of the Great Wall of China, and a Chinese garden accompanied by a lake. A panda habitat was also planned, although Genting noted the difficulties in obtaining a panda permit from the Chinese government, and later scrapped this as well.

Other ideas, which also went unrealized, included a theme park similar to Genting SkyWorlds in Malaysia; a 7.5-acre (3.0 ha) indoor water park; a 50,000 sq ft (4,600 m^{2}) aquarium, measuring 58 feet in height and containing various exotic fish; and a "celestial sphere" which would display guests' selfie images, a feature that was expected to appeal to millennial customers.

Regarding the theme, Steelman said in 2015, "It's a Chinese-themed resort, but it's not a themed resort in the sense that we're sitting around trying to copy Tiananmen Square and make it a dusty old replica. It's not a fully-themed, over-the-top kind of thing where we're trying to copy every single thing in China." Edward Farrell, the resort's original president, said in 2017 that the project's first design "had a lot of traditional, older Chinese architecture and elements". Genting had spent years studying the Las Vegas market and eventually decided on a modern design instead, with Farrell describing the project as "much more Shanghai than maybe Beijing, with technology and a modern looking feel." He further stated that Genting went "back and forth on a lot of design elements. [...] The more modern Chinese theme fits in more to where we're really going with this resort. When we open up, we'll use the newest and most recent technology and have appeal to people over the next 30, 40, 50 years."

Scott Sibella was named president in 2019, and said the resort would have only a minimal Asian theme, appealing to a broader clientele. Genting originally planned to target middle-income residents from Asia as a key demographic.

=== Wynn Resorts lawsuit ===
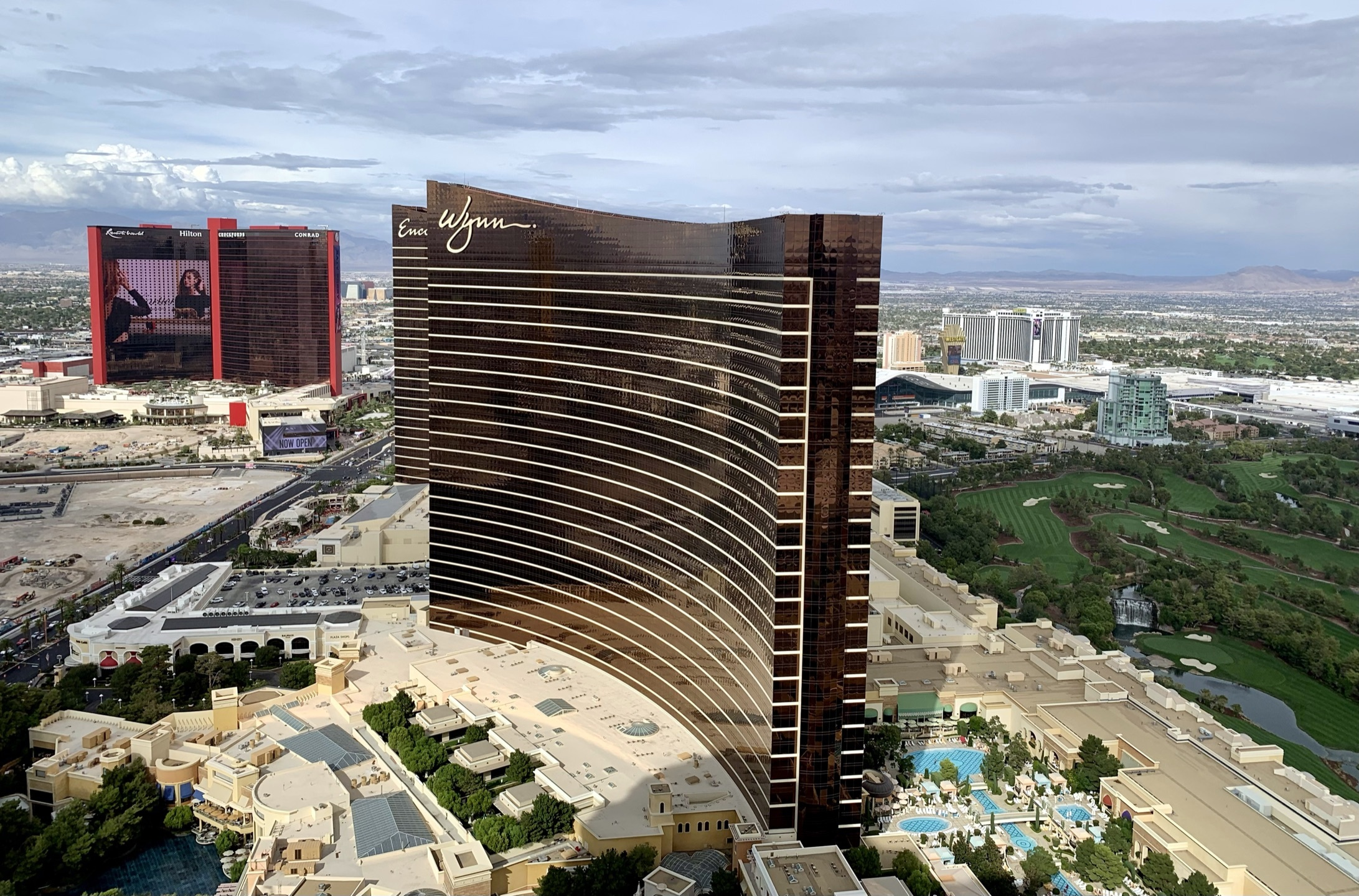
The Wynn properties across from Resorts World, 2021

In December 2018, Wynn Resorts filed a federal trademark infringement lawsuit against Genting, alleging similarities between Resorts World and the nearby Wynn/Encore properties. Such similarities included a curved facade and horizontal lines between panels of bronze glass. Wynn Resorts alleged that Genting planned to profit by misleading visitors of Resorts World into believing that it was affiliated with Wynn's properties.

Attorneys for Resorts World noted that the project had nearly two years to go before its planned opening and that it presently consisted of "a bare, skeletal structure covered by a few floors of window paneling"; once complete, the resort would look "dramatically different from Wynn's properties, dispelling any suggestion that a reasonable consumer could confuse the two resorts for each other."

Attorneys for the project also said that renderings had been shown to Wynn executives during July 2018, and that the project had since been redesigned to reduce similarities with the Wynn properties. According to Resorts World attorneys, "Given that Wynn was aware at least six months ago of (Resorts World Las Vegas) design renderings that arguably looked more similar to Wynn's properties than do the current renderings, its heavy-handed, holiday-timed filing appears more directed at shutting down construction of a business competitor than avoiding any hypothetical confusion of customers two years down the road."

New renderings of the project, created a month after the lawsuit was filed, showed the resort with red and orange facades. Wynn said these renderings "do not reflect the actual construction directly across the street from our resort", and sought a temporary restraining order against the project with the potential to shut down construction. Wynn and Genting settled the dispute in January 2019; the latter agreed to make several design changes to differentiate from the Wynn properties.

== Features ==
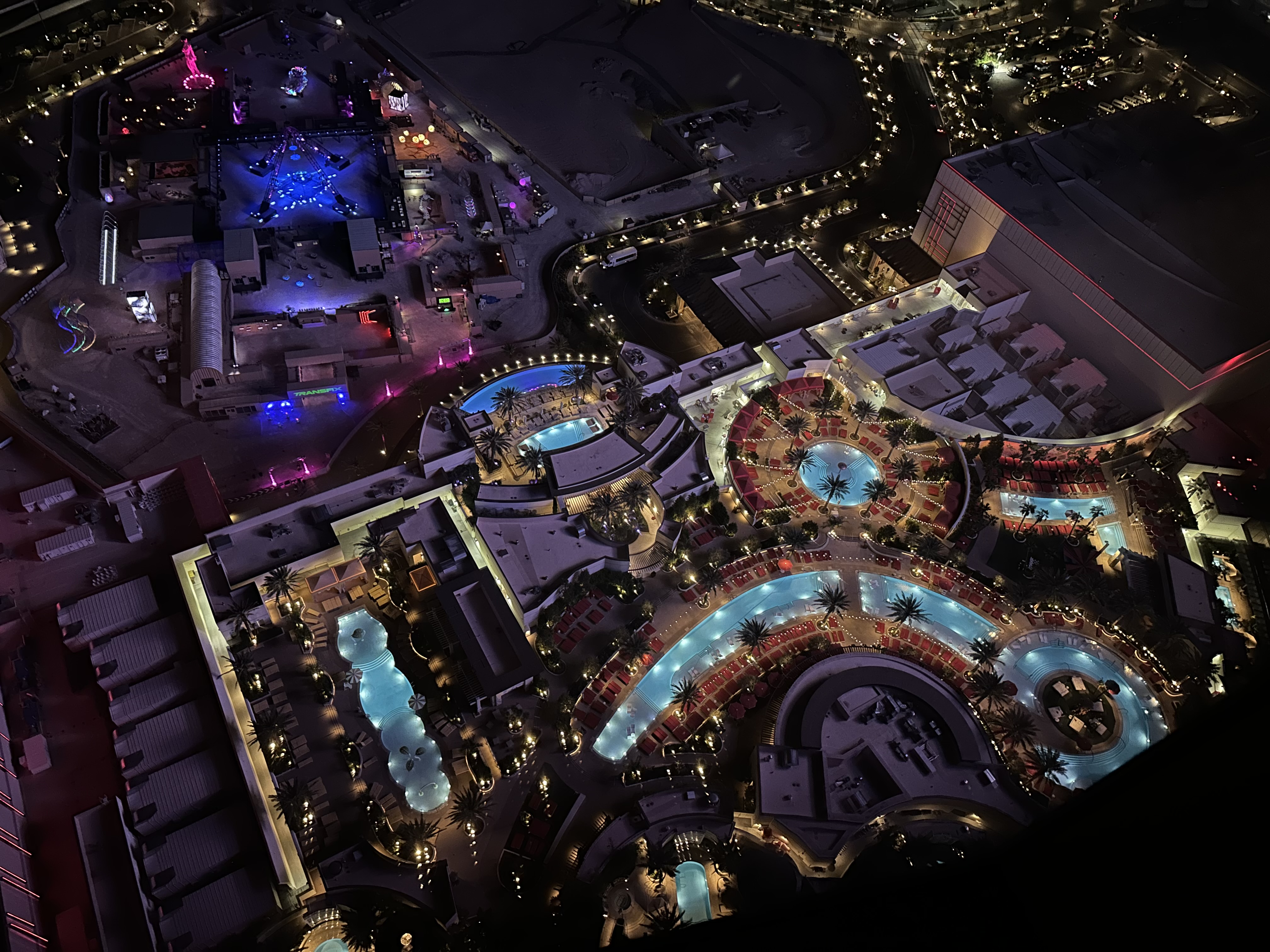
Pool complex at Resorts World

Resorts World Las Vegas includes a 117,000-square-foot (10,900 m^{2}) casino, with 1,400 slot machines, 117 table games, a poker room, and a sportsbook. The resort is technologically integrated. It accepts cryptocurrency through a partnership with Gemini, and the casino floor offers optional cashless wagering at slots and table games, with the use of a mobile wallet. The resort partnered with five companies, including Konami Gaming and International Game Technology, to provide cashless wagering. Table game chips use RFID technology for tracking purposes, as part of the resort's loyalty program. Resorts World is a non-smoking property aside from its casino.

Other features include Awana Spa, and a nine-pool complex covering 5.5 acres (2.2 ha), including an 1,800 foot infinity pool overlooking the Strip. It is expected that 75 percent of the resort's revenue will come from non-gaming options such as live entertainment and restaurants. The property is decorated with thousands of trees, 100 of which were salvaged from the Stardust.

=== Hotels ===
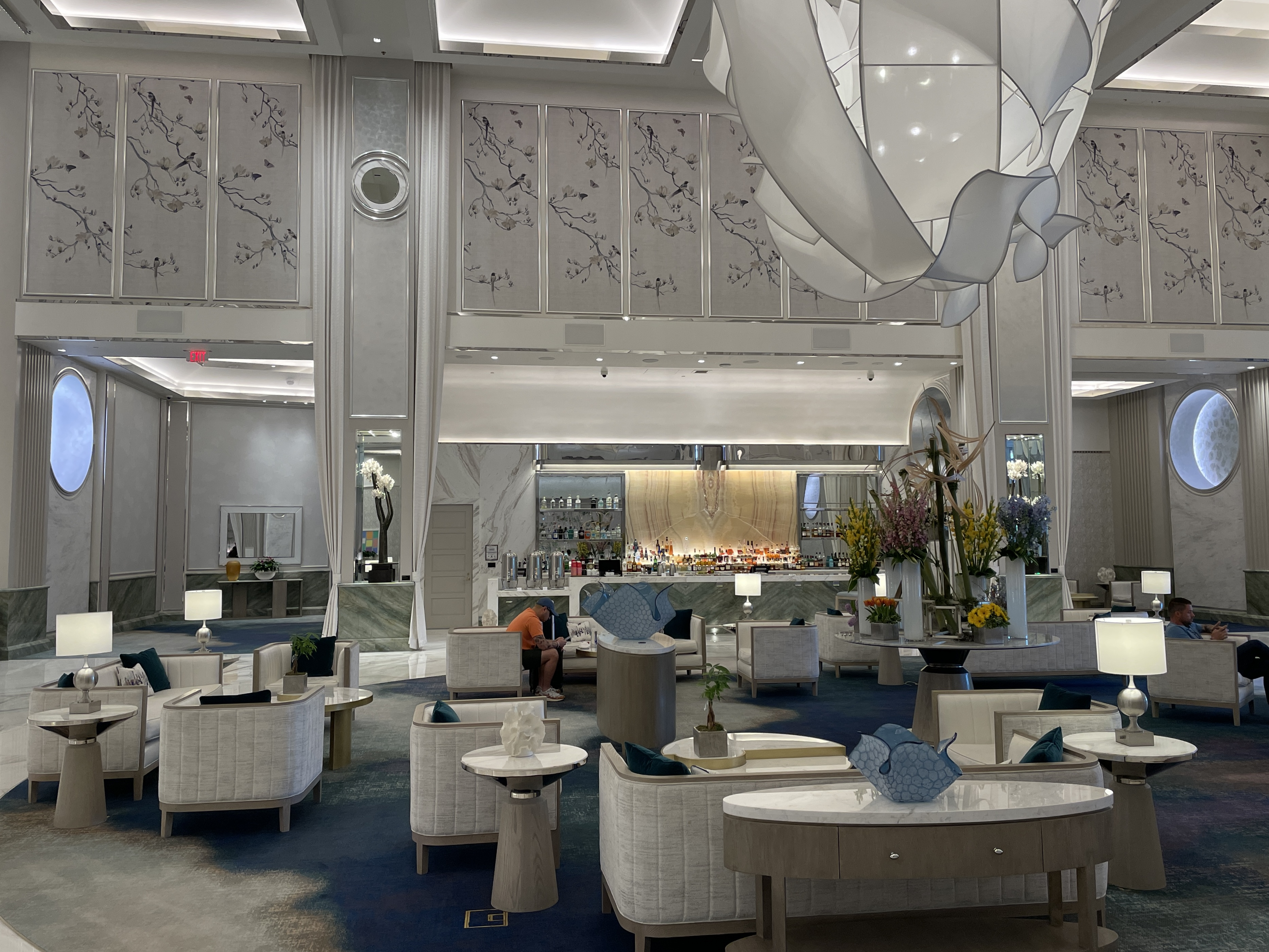
Crockfords hotel lobby

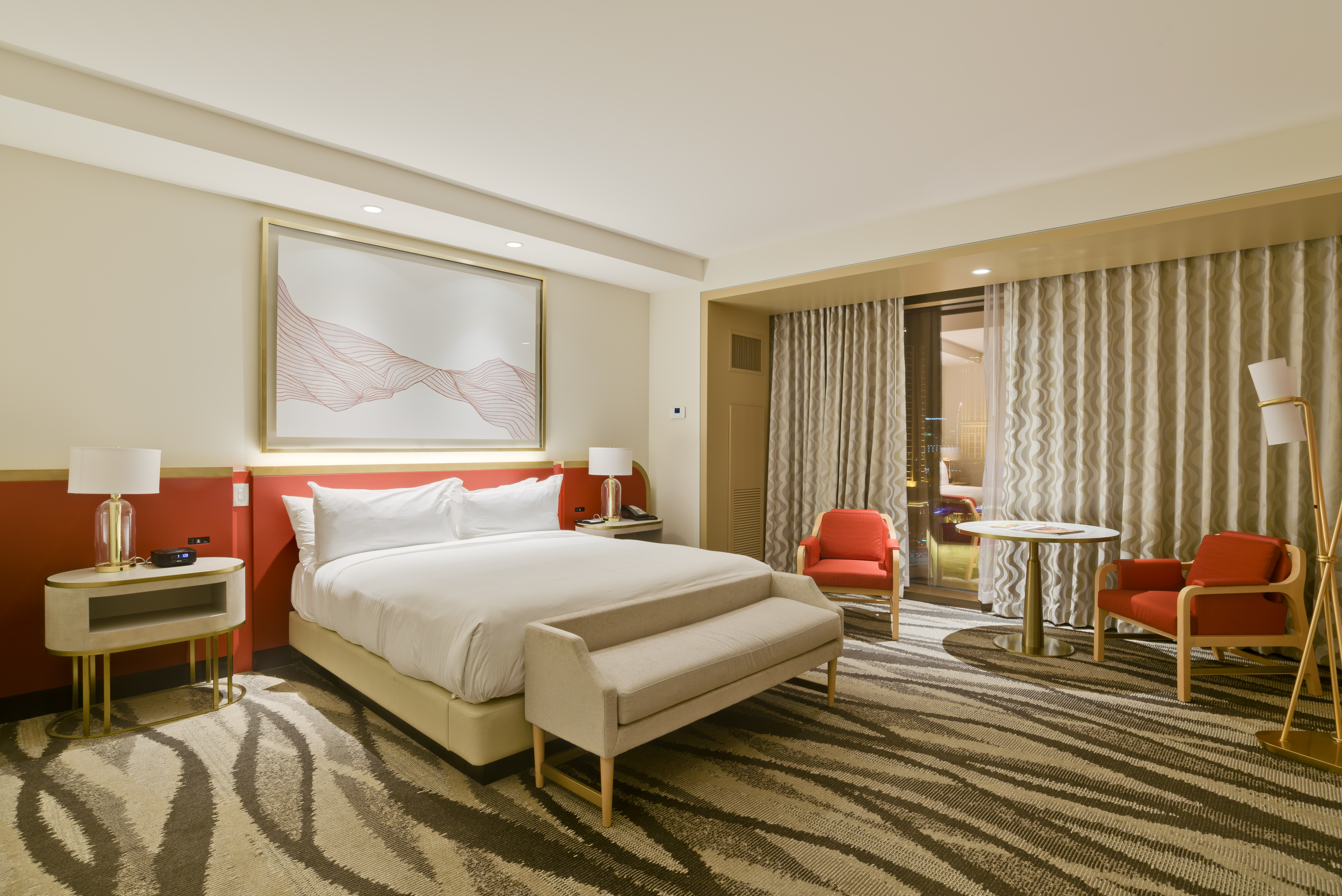
A king room in the Conrad

Resorts World includes a 59-story hotel building with a total of 3,506 rooms, divided across three Hilton-affiliated hotels. It is the largest Hilton hotel property in the world, and includes Las Vegas Hilton at Resorts World, with 1,678 rooms; Conrad Las Vegas at Resorts World, the largest Conrad hotel in the world, with 1,496 rooms; and the high-end Crockfords Las Vegas, an LXR Hotel & Resort brand, which houses the remaining 332 rooms. The diversity of hotel types allows the resort to cater to a variety of guests, with Crockfords offering the highest level of luxury.

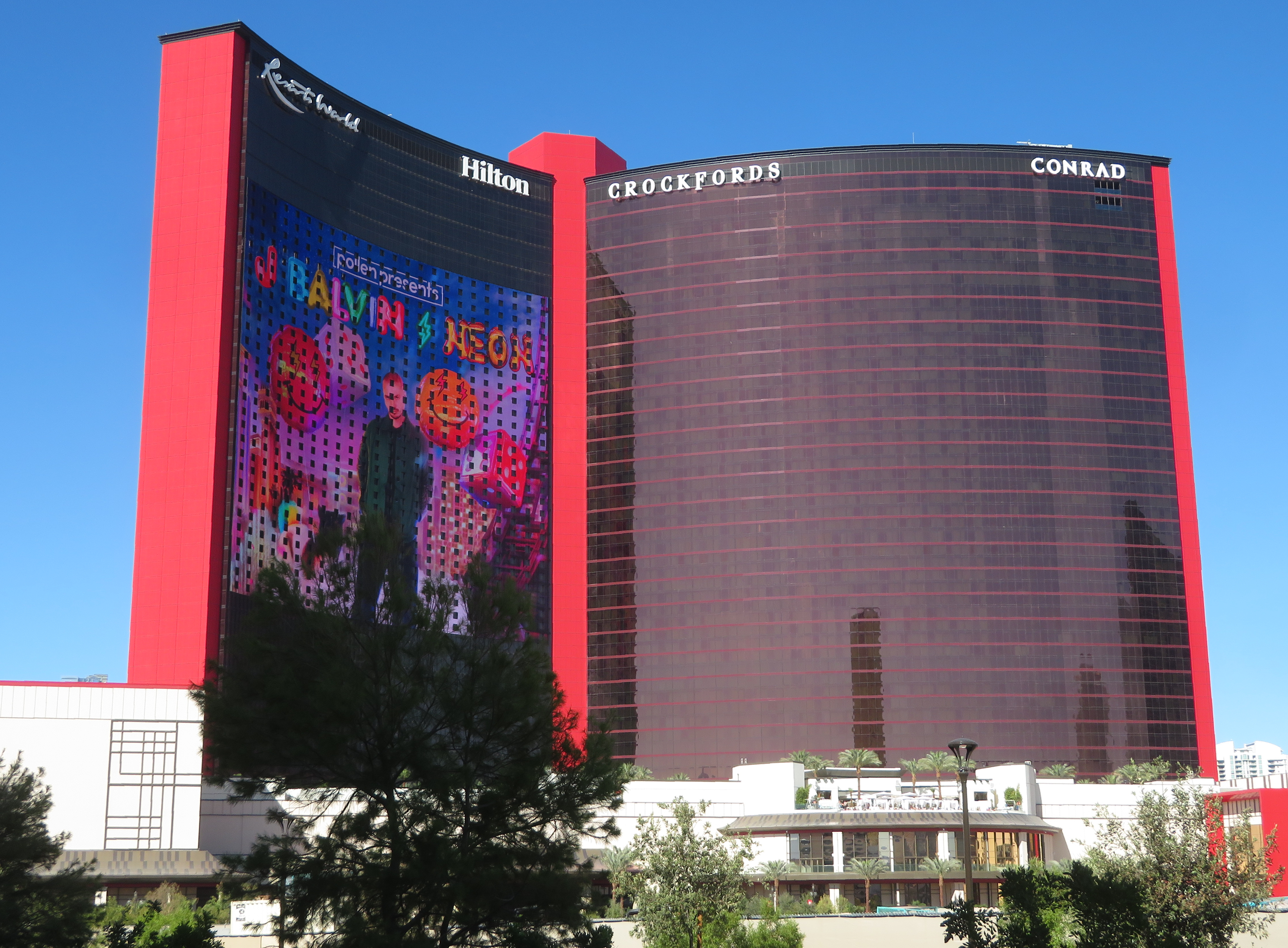
Hotel tower and its main LED screen

Each hotel has its own lobby, and the Conrad lobby features three robotic AIBO puppies which greet guests. The hotels feature keyless room entry, by using Bluetooth through a guest's smartphone. A digital concierge service, known as Red, is accessible through a mobile app and the resort's website, allowing guests to make reservations, ask questions, and check in and out of the hotel. The hotel tower does not include a fourth floor, as "four" is considered an unlucky number in many Asian countries.

The tower's exterior contains 1.2 million square feet of red-colored metal panels and bronze glass. The west half of the tower has a 100,000 sq ft (9,300 m^{2}) exterior LED screen, measuring 294 feet in height and 340 feet in width. It took seven months to construct. The LED screen faces south, and is made of a somewhat-transparent aluminum mesh, allowing hotel guests to still see outside their windows. The tower's east end features a smaller LED screen measuring 19,000 sq ft (1,800 m^{2}), 300 feet tall and 64 feet wide. In addition to promoting the resort, the screens also provide paid advertising through a partnership with Clear Channel Outdoor.

=== Restaurants and bars ===
Resorts World has more than 40 restaurants and bars, including Genting Palace, which serves Asian food, and Carversteak by businessman Sean Christie. Zouk Group offers social gaming bar RedTail as well as an Asian restaurant known as Fuhu.

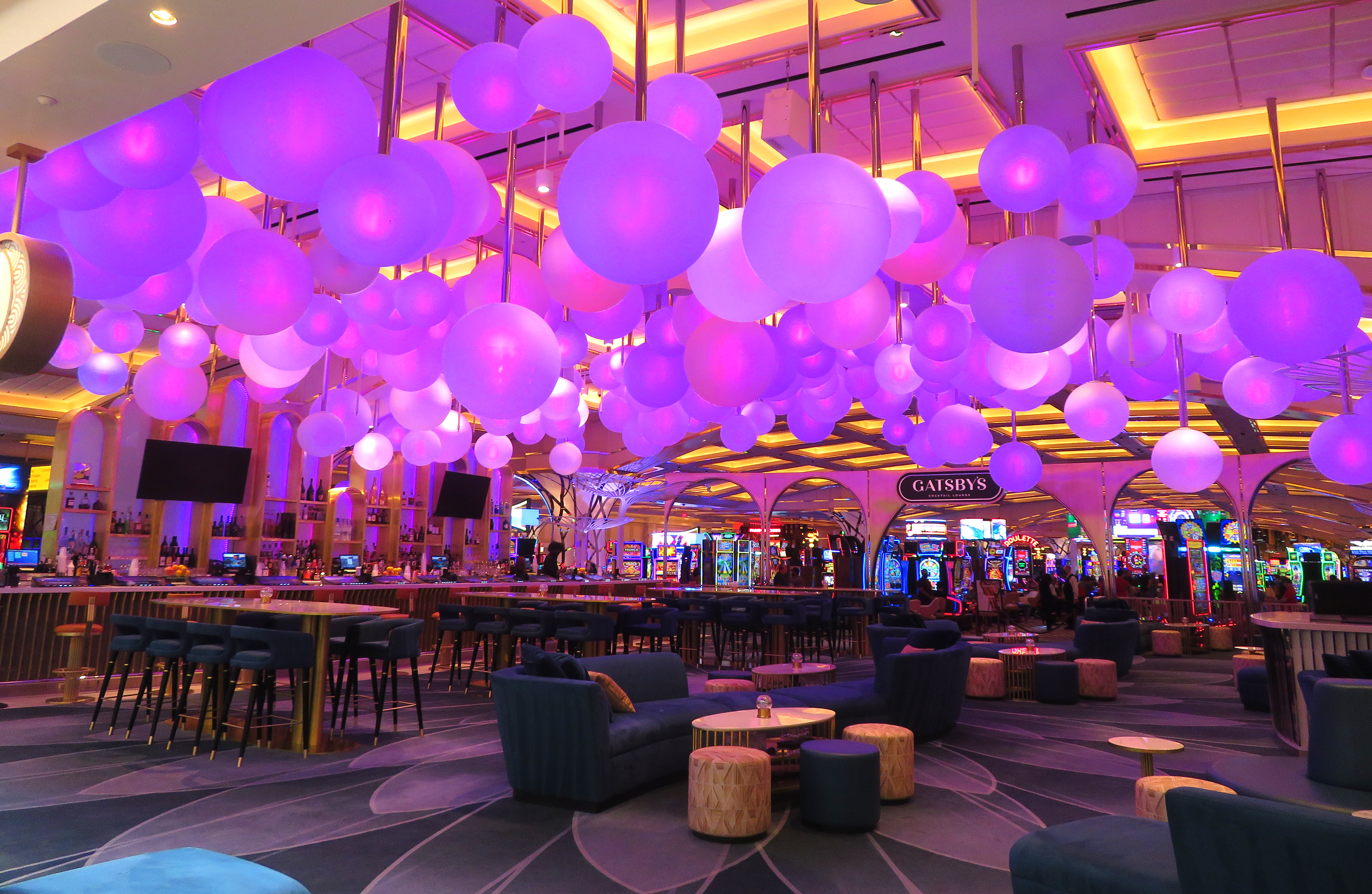
Gatsby's Cocktail Lounge

Famous Food Street Eats is an indoor food street of 16 food stalls, featuring Western and Southeast Asian cuisines. Measuring 24,000 sq ft (2,200 m^{2}), the food street's proprietors include Steve Aoki and Marcus Samuelsson. The entrance features a 10-foot-tall lucky cat sculpture, made by artist Red Hong Yi using gold coins.

Resorts World also includes Wally's, a 13,000 sq ft (1,200 m^{2}) wine bar and restaurant. The 4,090 sq ft (380 m^{2}) Gatsby's Cocktail Lounge provides wraparound views of the casino floor. The 66th floor of the hotel tower includes the Allē Lounge overlooking the Strip. The District includes Mulberry Street Pizzeria, part of a chain owned by actress Cathy Moriarty and Richie Palmer.

Since opening, guest room service has been provided by Grubhub, making Resorts World the first resort to partner with an outside company, and to integrate a mobile food-ordering and delivery app as a hotel guest amenity, replacing traditional room service.

=== Retail center ===
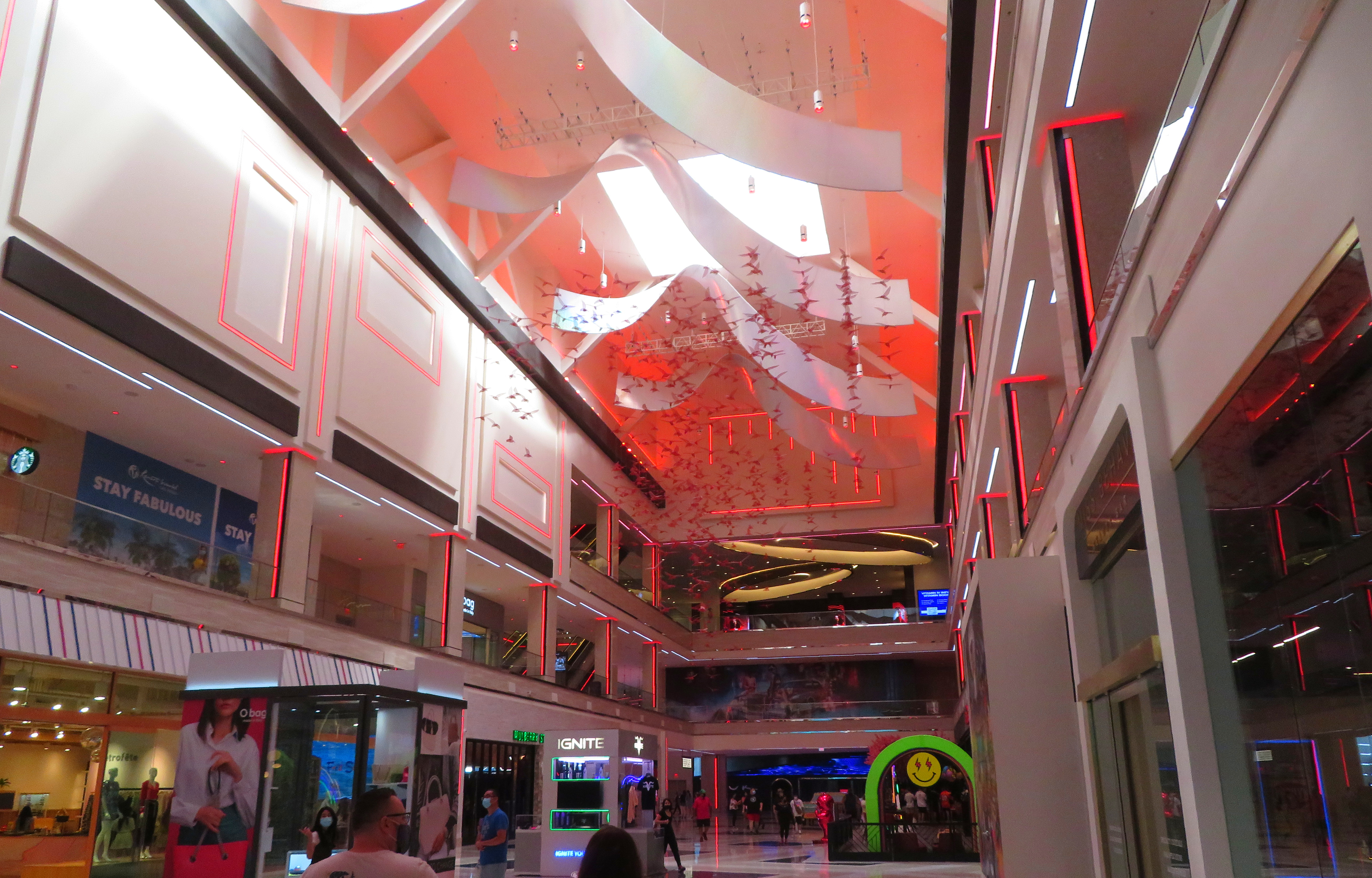
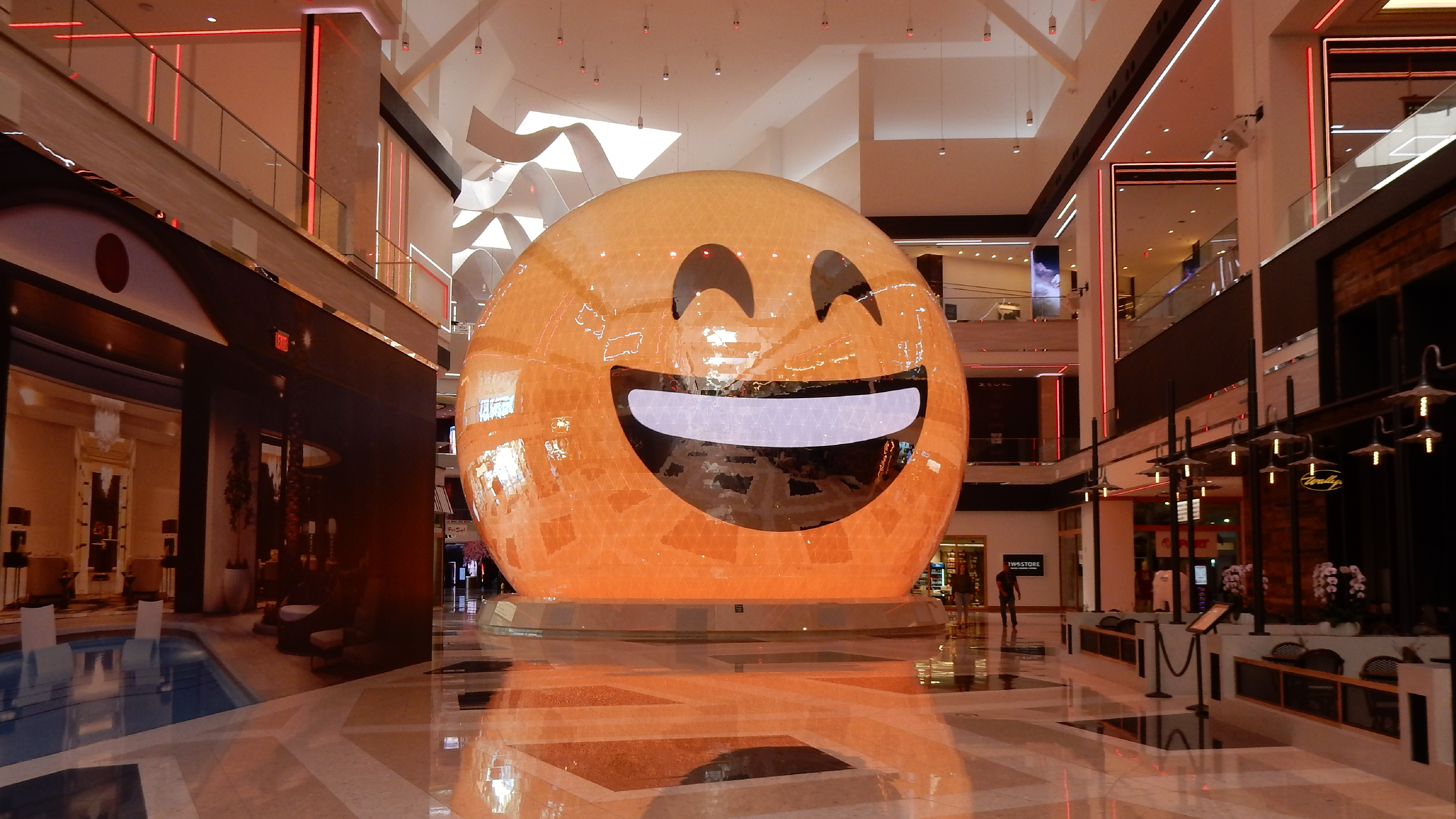
The District and its Globe LED display

Resorts World includes The District, a 70,000 sq ft (6,500 m^{2}) two-level luxury retail center. It features global and bespoke brands, including Twila True. It also has several Fred Segal stores, one of which is cashier-less, using Amazon's "Just Walk Out" technology, which automatically detects items taken from the store, then charges customers' credit cards. Another store, Kardashian Kloset, sells clothing formerly owned by the Kardashian family.

The District also contains several of the resort's restaurants and The Globe, an LED video globe measuring 50 feet in diameter. The Globe stands 40 feet high and has 8,640 triangular LED panels with a total of 20 million pixels, capable of projecting numerous interactive images.

=== Convention space and shuttle ===
Convention-goers are a target demographic for the resort, which opened with 250,000 sq ft (23,000 m^{2}) of meeting space. In June 2022, Resorts World Station opened as one of five stops of the Las Vegas Convention Center Loop, an underground Tesla shuttle service. It was built by The Boring Company and transports visitors between the resort and the nearby Las Vegas Convention Center. In 2023, plans were announced to build additional convention space on the resort's northwest corner, incorporating an unfinished portion of the Echelon project.

== Entertainment ==
Resorts World has 100,000 sq ft (9,300 m^{2}) of entertainment space, including Resorts World Theatre, which has capacity for up to 5,000 people. Designed by Scéno Plus, the theatre is operated by AEG Presents, and contains one of the largest and tallest stages on the Strip. The theatre hosts concert residencies by various singers, with Carrie Underwood opening the venue on December 1, 2021.

Zouk is the first U.S. nightclub for Singapore-based Zouk Group, and the company also operates Ayu Dayclub, an outdoor pool venue with a Southeast Asian island theme. Both have featured celebrated DJs, including Zedd, Tiësto, and Illenium. Residencies at Zouk have included rappers T-Pain and Jack Harlow.

=== Enhanced Games ===
Resorts World hosted the inaugural Enhanced Games, on 24 May 2026. The event was widely criticized and condemned by various sports bodies, medical experts and athletes. It was often dubbed as the "steroid Olympics".

== See also ==
- List of largest hotels
- List of integrated resorts
