= Genting Group =

Malaysian conglomerate

Genting Berhad
- Type: Public
- Traded as: MYX: 3182
- ISIN: MYL3182OO002
- Industry: leisure & hospitality, mass media
- Founded: 1965; 61 years ago
- Founder: Lim Goh Tong, Mohamed Noah Omar
- Headquarters: 14th Floor, Wisma Genting, 50250 Kuala Lumpur, Malaysia
- Area served: Worldwide
- Key people: Tan Sri Lim Kok Thay (Executive Chairman); Dato' Sri Tan Kong Han (Chief Executive, President and Executive Director)
- Products: Hotel, casino and entertainment
- Brands: Resorts World, Genting,Genting Club,Crockfords and Maxims
- Services: Tourism, resorts, cruises, gambling, plantations and Genting Energy Limited
- Revenue: ▲RM27.7 billion (FYE 31 December 2024)
- Operating income: ▲RM8.8 billion (FYE 31 December 2024)
- Net income: ▲RM2.0 billion (FYE 31 December 2024)
- Total assets: ▲RM105.1 billion (FYE 31 December 2024)
- Total equity: ▲RM53.5 billion (FYE 31 December 2024)
- Number of employees: 54,000 globally
- Subsidiaries: Genting Malaysia Berhad; Genting Plantations Berhad; Genting Singapore PLC; Genting Energy Limited; Resorts World Las Vegas LLC
- Website: www.genting.com

The Genting Group is headquartered in Wisma Genting in Kuala Lumpur, Malaysia. The Group comprises the holding company Genting Berhad (MYX: 3182), its listed subsidiaries Genting Malaysia Berhad (MYX: 4715), Genting Plantations Berhad (MYX: 2291), Genting Singapore PLC (SGX: G13 ), as well as its wholly-owned subsidiary Genting Energy Limited.

Founded in 1965 by the late Malaysian entrepreneur Tan Sri Lim Goh Tong, Genting Berhad is chaired by Tan Sri Lim Kok Thay. As of 1 March 2025, Dato' Sri Tan Kong Han was appointed as the Chief Executive Officer (CEO), marking the first time the company has appointed a CEO from outside the founding family.

The group has developed, operated and marketed casinos and integrated resorts in different parts of the world, including the Americas, Australia, Malaysia, the Philippines, Singapore and the United Kingdom. The Group's pioneer integrated resort is Resorts World Genting, formerly known as Genting Highlands Resort. The main attractions of the resort are its casino, theme park, concert shows, food and beverage and retail shopping.

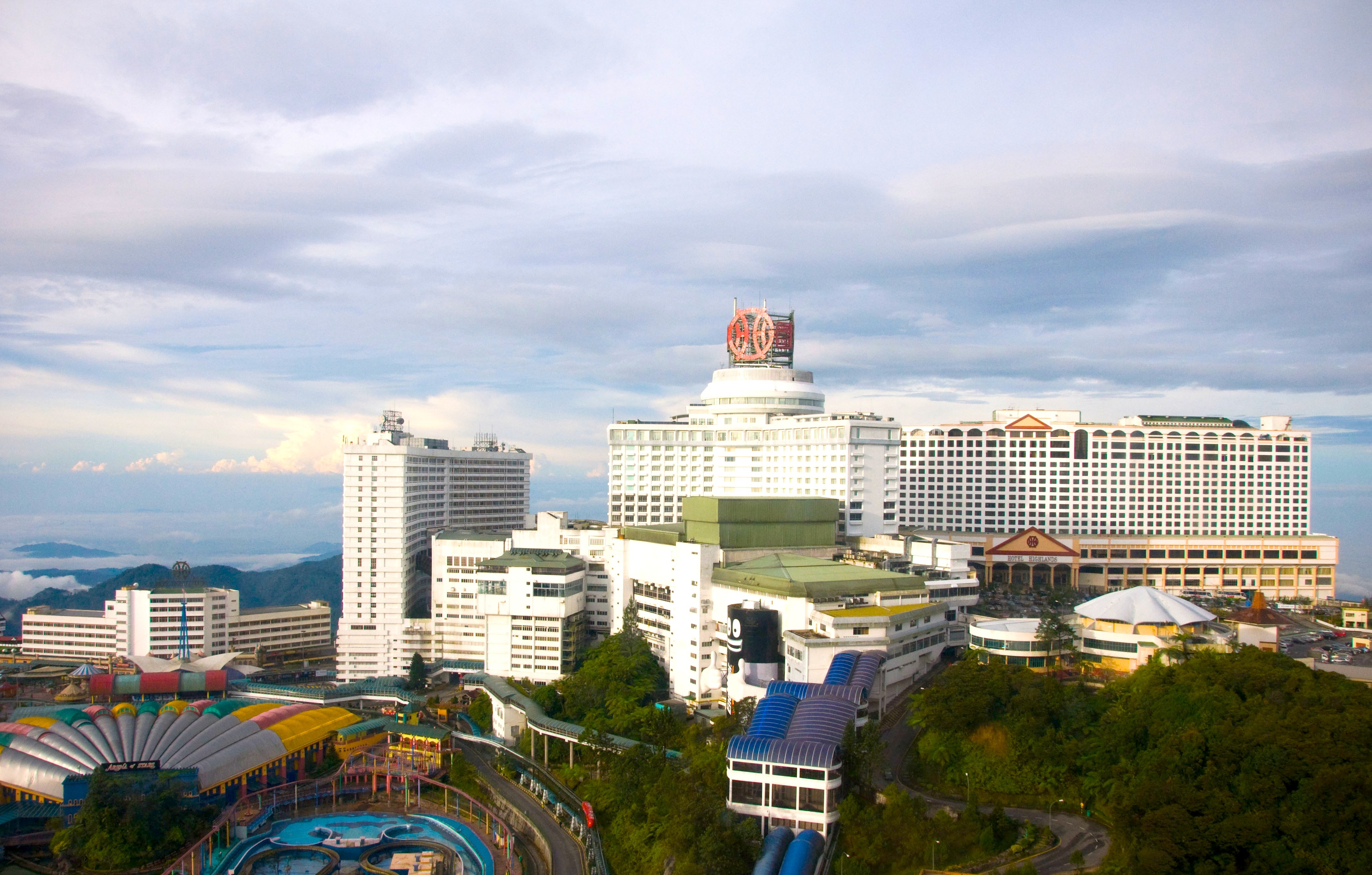
Resorts World Genting, Malaysia

From its initial leisure and hospitality activities, the Genting Group has expanded and diversified into other activities including plantations, properties, power generation, oil and gas, life sciences and biotechnology.

The Group employs about 54,000 people worldwide and have over 18,000 hotel rooms and 243,200 hectares of land bank for plantation and property development.

== Group structure ==
Genting Berhad is principally an investment holding and management company. The company is headquartered in Malaysia. It is listed on the main board of Bursa Malaysia, with a market capitalisation of RM14.9 billion (about USD3.5 billion) as at 31 December 2024.

- Genting Singapore Limited (52.6% owned by Genting Berhad) – investment holding company. It is listed on Singapore Stock Exchange. Market capitalisation was about SGD9.24 billion (USD6.88 billion as of 31 December 2024.
- Genting Malaysia Berhad (49.3% owned by Genting Berhad) – It is involved in leisure and hospitality, gambling and entertainment which includes its casino businesses in Malaysia, in the Americas and the United Kingdom. Genting Malaysia owns and operates major properties including Resorts World Genting in Malaysia, Resorts World Casino New York City in the US, over 40 casinos including Resorts World Birmingham in the UK and Resorts World Bimini in the Bahamas. It is listed on the main board of Bursa Malaysia with a market capitalisation of about RM12.8 billion (USD3 billion) as at 31 December 2024.
- Genting Plantations Berhad (55.4% owned by Genting Berhad) – is involved in plantations, biotechnology and property, which includes its property arm, Genting Property. Genting Plantations owns 243,200 hectares of land in Malaysia and Indonesia. It is listed on the Main Market of Bursa Malaysia with about RM5.3 billion (USD1.2 billion) market capitalisation as of 31 December 2024.
- Kien Huat Realty – the real estate development and investment entity created by Genting founder Lim Goh Tong owns about 43.6 percent of Genting Berhad.

== Diversification and expansion ==
In December 2006, Genting Group won the bid in obtaining one of two Singapore casino licences to build an integrated resort, named Resorts World Sentosa, under Genting Singapore. The project requirements included hotel, gambling, leisure facilities, convention space and retail.

In 2007, Genting Plantations ventured into biotechnology to develop synthetic genomic processes and naturally occurring processes for alternative energy resources through an equally owned joint venture with "Synthetic Genomics".

In July 2007, Genting Group disposed of its paper and packaging business.

In August 2009, Genting Hong Kong opened Resorts World Manila in partnership with Alliance Global Group. It is one of four groups that won approval in 2008 to build hotels and casinos as part of Philippines' US$20 billion Pagcor City development on Manila Bay. In June 2009, Genting Group supported the capital raising exercise of MGM Mirage.

In August 2010, Genting Property began construction on an upscale retail destination, Johor Premium Outlets in partnership with Indianapolis, Indiana-based Simon Property Group, as part of a wider 7,000-acre (2,800 ha) integrated township project in the southern state of Johor.

In September 2010, Genting New York won a bid to build a racino at Aqueduct Racetrack in New York City, the first step of a planned expansion in the United States. Among the attributes of the plan was providing a diversion for passengers on extended stays at John F. Kennedy International Airport. Resorts World New York opened in October 2011.

In May 2011, Genting Malaysia purchased 14 acres (5.7 ha) of Biscayne Bay front land surrounding the headquarters of The Miami Herald for US$236 million; The McClatchy Company announced that the Herald and El Nuevo Herald would be moving to another location by 2013. The land is to be used for a mixed-use development, Resorts World Miami, that would include hotels, restaurants, residences, retail shops and a convention centre. Genting Group sees the Miami land acquisition as an integral step in its pursuit of expanding internationally in the leisure, hospitality and entertainment industry.

In June 2011, Genting UK was awarded a casino licence for a 55,000 sq-metre mixed-use facility in Birmingham. The development is in partnership with the NEC Group.

In March 2013, Genting bought the site of Echelon Place, an unfinished casino resort on the Las Vegas Strip and announced plans for Resorts World Las Vegas.

In May 2015, Genting Hong Kong purchased 100% ownership of Crystal Cruises and plans for expansion into river cruising, private jet charters using Boeing 777 aircraft and the new build of three 100,000 GT mega cruise ships was announced for the brand. Genting also announced the construction of a 204,000 GT ultra-luxury and giant cruise ship. In October 2016, Genting Hong Kong was entirely sold to the Lim Kok Thay's family-owned unit trust Golden Hope Limited as part of a family business restructuring exercise, separating it from Genting Group but retaining it under ownership of Lim Kok Thay's family.

In 2016, Genting announced the building of Resorts World Miami. This project will cost about US$3 billion. This project has the world's biggest swimming pool.

In 2017, Genting announced they would lend their name to a new resort, Resorts World Catskills. The casino was originally to be named Montreign Resort Casino.

In January 2018, Genting announced plans to build a new casino resort in Andorra. The resort is expected to cost EUR€105 million and will host many different musical and cultural events.

== Resort and casino properties ==
The Genting Group and its subsidiaries operate more than 50 resorts/casinos in 3 continents and 6 countries, the following are a list of properties owned by the Genting group of companies:

=== Malaysia ===
- Resorts World Genting, Genting Highlands, Pahang, Malaysia
- Resorts World Awana (Formerly Awana Genting Highlands Golf & Country Resort), Genting Highlands, Pahang, Malaysia
- Resorts World Kijal, Terengganu, Malaysia
- Resorts World Langkawi, Kedah, Malaysia

=== United Kingdom ===
Maxims Casino, Southend

As of December 2010, Genting Malaysia owns the largest number of casinos in the UK, with 46:

- Resorts World Birmingham
- Crockfords Club, London
- The Colony Club, London
- The Palm Beach Casino, London
- Maxims Casino Club, London
- Genting Casino, Bolton
- Genting Casino, Bournemouth
- Genting Casino, Blackpool
- Genting Casino, Brighton
- Genting Casino, Bristol
- Genting Casino, Coventry
- Genting Casino Cromwell Mint, London
- Genting Casino Edgbaston, Birmingham
- Genting Casino, Glasgow, Scotland
- Genting Casino, Leicester
- Genting Casino, Luton
- Genting Casino, Margate
- Genting Casino, Newcastle
- Genting Casino, Nottingham
- Genting Casino, Plymouth
- Genting Casino Renshaw Street, Liverpool
- Genting Casino, Salford
- Genting Casino, Torquay
- Genting Casino York Place, Edinburgh, Scotland
- Genting Chinatown Casino, Birmingham
- Genting Chinatown Casino, London
- Genting Casino Fountainpark, Edinburgh, Scotland
- Genting Casino, Manchester
- Genting Casino Queen Square, Liverpool
- Genting Casino, Reading
- Genting Casino Riverlights, Derby
- Genting Casino, Sheffield
- Genting Casino, Southport
- Genting Casino, Stoke-on-Trent
- Genting Casino Terminus Terrace, Southampton
- Genting Casino, Wirral
- Genting Electric, Luton
- Genting Electric, Portsmouth
- Genting Electric Westcliff, Southend
- Maxims Casino, Southend

Genting owns the Park Lane Mews Hotel in Mayfair, London.

=== Singapore ===
- Resorts World Sentosa
  - Universal Studios Singapore (in partnership with Universal Studios)
- Genting Hotel, Jurong
- StarDream Cruises (Formerly known as Resorts World Cruises)
  - StarCruises
  - Dream Cruises

=== Philippines ===
- Newport World Resorts (formerly Resorts World Manila; jointly owned with AGI)
- Resorts World Bayshore City (under construction; part of Entertainment City)

=== US and the Caribbean ===
- Resorts World New York City
- Resorts World Las Vegas
- Resorts World Miami (planned)
- Resorts World Bimini
- Resorts World Catskills (Owned & managed by Empire Resorts, an 88.7% subsidiary)
- Casino of the First Light, (planned)
- Resort World Hudson Valley (planned)

=== China ===
- Genting Resort Secret Garden

=== Online Casino ===
In August 2021, industry and business publications reported that Genting's UK-facing online casino operation (GentingCasino.com) migrated from a proprietary platform to the SkillOnNet platform. Reports also stated that sports betting would be discontinued as part of the transition, with the UK online offering focusing on casino products.

- Genting Casino Online UK
- Genting Casino Spain
- Genting Casino Online Germany
- Genting Casino Online Ireland

== Investments in the United States ==
- Foxwoods Resort Casino, Connecticut (capital loan to the Mashantucket Pequot tribe through Kien Huat Realty)
- Seneca Niagara Casino & Hotel, Niagara Falls, US (capital loan to Seneca Nation of Indians through Kien Huat Realty)
- Monticello Raceway, Catskills (majority shareholder of Empire Resorts through Kien Huat Realty)
- Massachusetts Region C casino development (financing the development and lobbying expenses behind Wampanoag people Casino of the First Light

== Previous properties ==
- Burswood Entertainment Complex, Perth, Australia (formerly known as Burswood Island Casino)
- Lucayan Beach Resort and Casino, Bahamas (in partnership with the Bahamian government)
- Norwegian Cruise Line, headquartered in Miami. Genting sold their remaining shares in December 2018.
- Genting Hong Kong
  - Star Cruises
  - Crystal Cruises
  - Dream Cruises
  - MV Werften

== See also ==
- List of casino hotels
- List of integrated resorts
