= Wrapchic =

British fast food chain

Wrapchic is an Indian burrito fast food chain. Mahesh Raikar, the owner of the company, opened the first location in Birmingham City Centre in June 2012. Wrapchic now has multiple locations from London to Birmingham to Edinburgh.

Wrapchic was one of 13 businesses that made it through final round of the Institute of Asian Businesses’ (IAB) annual business awards 2013 and Mahesh Raiker was shortlisted for Business person of the year award.
