= Resorts World Miami =

- Location: Miami, Florida, USA
- Theme: Chinese
- Gaming space: 10,000,000 square feet (930,000 m^{2})
- Owner: Genting Group

Resorts World Miami is the name of a major 13.9-acre (5.6-hectare) development proposed for the Omni District of Greater Downtown Miami, Florida, USA, by the Malaysian-based Genting Group. At 10,000,000 square feet (930,000 m^{2}) and with an estimated cost of US$3.2 billion, it is considered one of the largest developments in the history of the state. The project was postponed several times as gambling measures failed at the state level. As of August, 2022, the property remains cleared, but no development has begun. As a concession for rights to build the large Casino project, Genting has proposed to build the long-sought BayLink system as a monorail linking Miami to Miami Beach, connecting to a new Metromover station within their project.

== Proposed Attractions ==
The plan, which includes a large eight story podium and several stylized skyscrapers, is proposed for several lots owned by Genting, including the site of the Miami Herald and El Nuevo Herald headquarters building, which was demolished, and the adjacent Omni International Mall. It is proposed to contain a casino, bars and nightclubs, a luxury galleria consisting of vast amounts of retail, restaurants, entertainment and convention space as well as other unique amenities, including one of the largest swimming pools in the world. Two condominium towers will also have 1000 units each.
