= Resorts World Bimini =

Resort and casino in Bimini, Bahamas

- Location: Bimini, Bahamas
- Opened: 2013; 13 years ago
- No. of rooms: 307
- Casino type: Land-based
- Owner: Genting Group
- Website: rwbimini.com

Resorts World Bimini Bahamas is a 750-acre (300 ha) Caribbean beachfront resort and casino located on North Bimini Island. Opened in 2013, the resort is operated by the Malaysia-based Genting Group. Their corporate office for the southeast USA is located in downtown Miami, Florida. The resort is located in Bimini, Bahamas, 42 miles east of Miami, Florida. Estimated cost to be built is US$220 Million.

== History and development ==
In June 2012, Genting Group signed a deal to open Resorts World Bimini Bay. It included a partnership between Genting Malaysia Berhad and RAV Bahamas, the developer of Bimini Bay and the Rockwell Island Beach Estates. The Resorts World Bimini Casino opened in June 2013. It is the only casino on the island and the closest offshore casino to South Florida. In late June, 2013, Resorts World introduced the MS Bimini Superfast, a German built ship that brings passengers from Miami to Bimini.

Prime Minister of the Bahamas, Rt. Honorable Perry G. Christie, and the Chairman of the Genting Group, Mr. K.T. Lim, were in attendance at the opening ceremony of the new pier. Most of the cabinet ministers of the Bahama Islands were also present. Mr. Christie said that projects such as the development of Resorts World Bimini will lead to more economic development for Bahamians.

The opening of the pier is phase one of an intended three-phase development plan for North Bimini Island by Resorts World Bimini. Also included in phase one is the opening of a temporary customs and immigration facility. Beginning in late 2014 phase two will be undertaken, which will include the construction of a permanent facility for customs and immigration. The final phase will begin during the summer of 2015, adding a restaurant, beach club, craft market and a variety of water sports. Bimini Superfast service to the new pier was ultimately discontinued but several major cruise lines now dock there.

In 2014, Resorts World Bimini started construction on a 307-room luxury hotel on Bimini, and acquired an additional 16.2 acres (6.6 ha) of land next to the resort. From opening until April 1, 2025, the hotel operated as a Hilton Hotels & Resorts branded property.

== Features ==
Resorts World Bimini has around 480 townhouses and villas, six restaurants, the largest marina in the Bahamas, and gambling facilities.

== Concerns ==
In 2017, there were protests against the resort by residents who have said that the projects lack transparency and are destructive to the environment.

== See also ==
- List of integrated resorts
