= U77 =

U77 may refer to:

- German submarine U-77, various vessels
- HMAS Yarra (U77), a sloop of the Royal Australian Navy
- Small nucleolar RNA SNORD77
- Uppland Runic Inscription 77
- U77, a line of the Düsseldorf Stadtbahn
