= Norwegian Sun =

Sun-class cruise ship launched in 2000

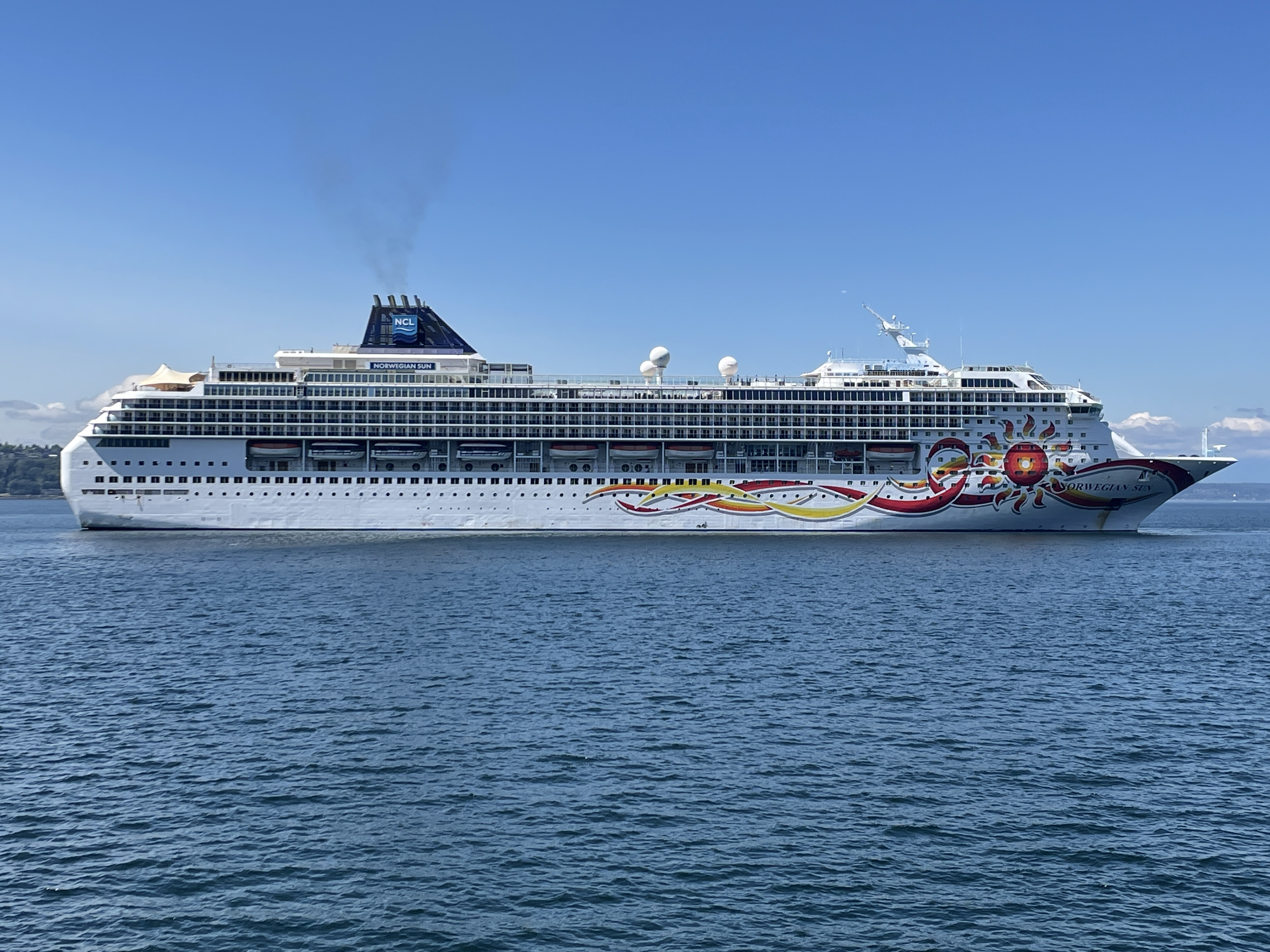
- Norwegian Sun near Seattle, 2022

History

Bahamas
- Name: Norwegian Sun (2001–2027); Sun (2027)
- Owner: Norwegian Cruise Line Holdings
- Operator: Norwegian Cruise Line (2001–2027); Cordelia Cruises (2027)
- Port of registry: Nassau, Bahamas
- Builder: Lloyd Werft; Bremerhaven, Germany
- Launched: 23 September 2000
- Sponsored by: Brooke Burke
- Christened: 17 November 2001
- Maiden voyage: 10 September 2001
- In service: 2001–present
- Identification: Call sign: C6RN3; IMO number: 9218131; MMSI number: 311109000
- Status: In service

General characteristics
- Class & type: Sun-class cruise ship
- Tonnage: 78,309 GT
- Length: 848 ft (258.47 m)
- Beam: 32.3 m (105.97 ft)
- Height: 59.5 m (195.2 ft)
- Draft: 8.60 m (28.22 ft)
- Decks: 14
- Speed: 23 knots (43 km/h; 26 mph)
- Capacity: 1,976 passengers (2,400 maximum)
- Crew: 906

Norwegian Sun is a Sun-class cruise ship operated by Norwegian Cruise Line. She entered service in 2001 in a dual christening ceremony at the Port of Miami with Norwegian Star. She was constructed at the Lloyd Werft shipyard in Bremerhaven, Germany.

On April 7, 2025, it was announced Norwegian Sun, along with her sister ship Norwegian Sky would be put on a long-term charter to ''Cordelia Cruises''. Norwegian Sun will transfer out of the Norwegian fleet in 2027.

== Vessel class ==
Norwegian Sun is the third and final ship of this design. She was preceded by Norwegian Sky (entered service in 1999, relaunched as Pride of Aloha in 2004); and Costa Victoria of Costa Cruises (entered service in 1996). NCL defines both Norwegian Sun and Norwegian Sky as Sun class ships.

== Cruising areas ==
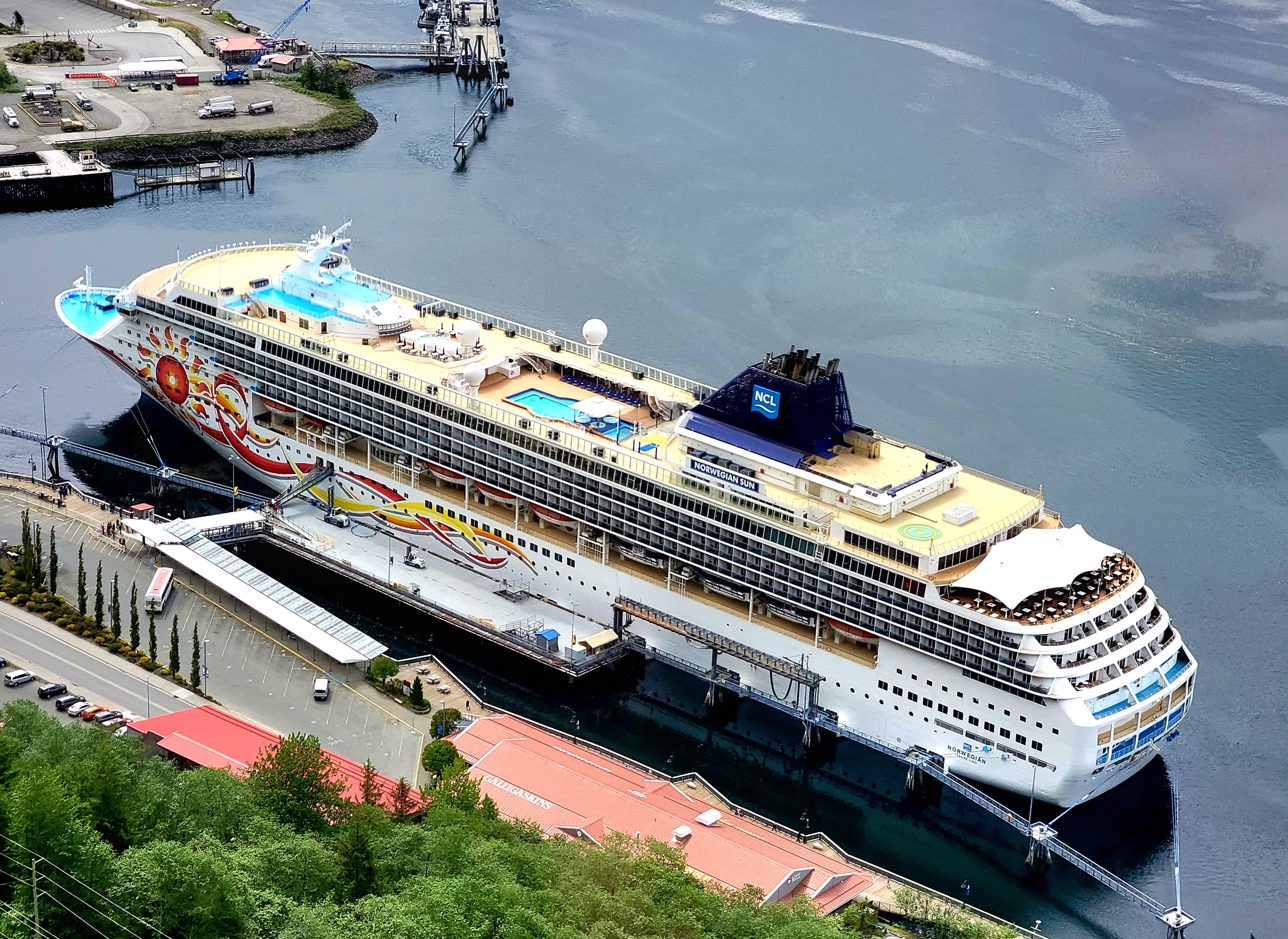
Norwegian Sun at Juneau, Alaska

Beginning October 2010, she was homeported at Port Canaveral, later Miami, Florida.

In 2017 Norwegian Sun sailed from Vancouver, British Columbia, Canada to Seward, Alaska. On 5 October 2017, she went from San Francisco to Miami. She continued to Los Angeles on a fourteen-night voyage. After returning to Miami she served the month of November sailing round-trip voyages in the Caribbean from Miami. Her 2017 calendar ended with two-week voyages along the Western South American coast to Valparaiso, Chile.

In May 2018 the ship repositioned to Port Canaveral to operate cruises to Havana with Key West Florida, and to the Bahamas to either Freeport or Nassau and Great Stirrup Cay.

Between 9 September and 14 October 2018, Norwegian Sun operated cruises from Miami to Havana, Great Stirrup Cay, Costa Maya, Mexico and Harvest Caye, Belize.

In June 2019, it was announced that, following the travel ban preventing U.S. cruise ships from visiting Cuba, Norwegian Sun would no longer be offering their "open bar" service and would instead transition to the traditional way for charging for onboard drinks.

Beginning in 2026, Norwegian Sun will no longer sail from Seattle to Alaska during the summer cruise season in the northern hemisphere. Her new homeport will be Helsinki, and she will sail the Baltic Sea, also offering cruises from Copenhagen. She will visit ports in Sweden, Norway, Germany, Lithuania and Poland.

== Incidents ==
=== 2022 iceberg collision ===
On June 25, 2022, while cruising near Alaska's Hubbard Glacier, the ship collided with a small iceberg known as a "growler". The ship docked in Juneau, where it was inspected by the Coast Guard. There was some damage found, but the ship was allowed to continue on a shortened itinerary. After the passengers disembarked, the ship was taken out of service for over two weeks for repairs.
