= Cordelia Cruises =

Indian cruise line

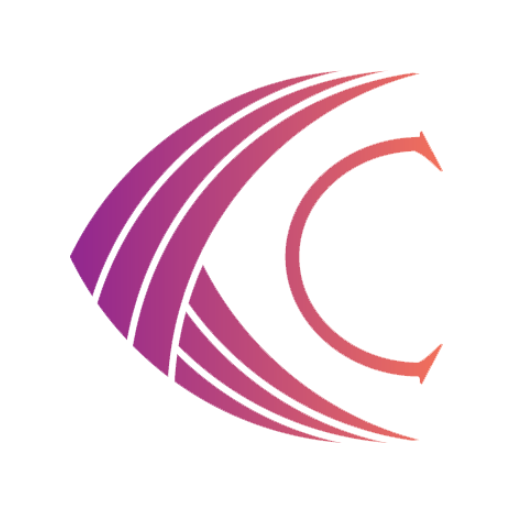
- Founded: 2021
- Headquarters: Mumbai, Maharashtra, India
- Area served: Indian Ocean, Southeast Asia
- Key people: Jurgen Bailom (President and CEO)
- Parent: Waterways Leisure Tourism Limited
- Website: www.cordeliacruises.com

Cordelia Cruises is an Indian cruise line headquartered in Mumbai. It is a subsidiary and travel brand of Waterways Leisure Tourism Limited, which was incorporated in November 2020. In late December 2020, the company acquired the former Royal Caribbean ship Empress of the Seas, which became Cordelia Empress. The Cordelia Cruises brand launched in 2021, with its maiden voyage departing from Mumbai in September 2021.

The line has since expanded operations across India's east and west coasts and to regional international destinations. By the mid-2020s, Cordelia Empress had carried over 600,000 guests. In 2025, the company announced fleet expansion plans, supported by an IPO, and signed agreements for two additional vessels, Norwegian Sky and Norwegian Sun, from Norwegian Cruise Line.

Cordelia Cruises offers short coastal cruises and longer voyages from ports such as Mumbai, Chennai, Kochi, Visakhapatnam, and others. Popular destinations include Lakshadweep, Goa, Puducherry, Sri Lanka, and expanding routes to Southeast Asia (Thailand, Singapore, Malaysia).

== fleet ==
Ship	Built	Builder	Gross tonnage	Notes	Image
current fleet
Empress	1990	Chantiers de l'Atlantique	48,563 GT	Empress of the Seas until 2020.	
Sky	1999	Lloyd Werft	77,104 GT	Norwegian Sky until 2026.	
future fleet
Sun	2001	Lloyd Werft	78,309 GT	Currently Norwegian Sun until 2027.	

== See also ==
- List of cruise lines
