= German submarine U-77 =

U-77 may refer to one of the following German submarines:

- SM U-77, a Type UE I submarine launched in 1916 and that served in World War I until sunk 7 July 1916
  - During World War I, Germany also had these submarines with similar names:
    - SM UB-77, a Type UB III submarine launched in 1917 and surrendered on 16 January 1919; broken up at Swansea in 1922
    - SM UC-77, a Type UC II submarine launched in 1916 and sunk on 14 July 1918
- German submarine U-77, a Type VIIC submarine that served in World War II until sunk on 28 March 1943
