= German submarine U-76 =

U-76 may refer to one of the following German submarines:

- SM U-76, a Type UE I submarine launched in 1916 and that served in World War I until sunk 22 January 1917
  - During World War I, Germany also had these submarines with similar names:
    - SM UB-76, a Type UB III submarine launched in 1917 and surrendered on 12 February 1919; broken up at Rochester in 1922
    - SM UC-76, a Type UC II submarine launched in 1916 and surrendered on 1 December 1918; broken up at Briton Ferry in 1919–20
- German submarine U-76, a Type VIIB submarine that served in World War II until sunk on 5 April 1941
