= U76 =

U76 may refer to:

- German submarine U-76, various vessels
- HMS Londonderry (U76), a sloop of the Royal Navy
- U76, a line of the Düsseldorf Stadtbahn
