= Norwegian Sky =

Cruise ship

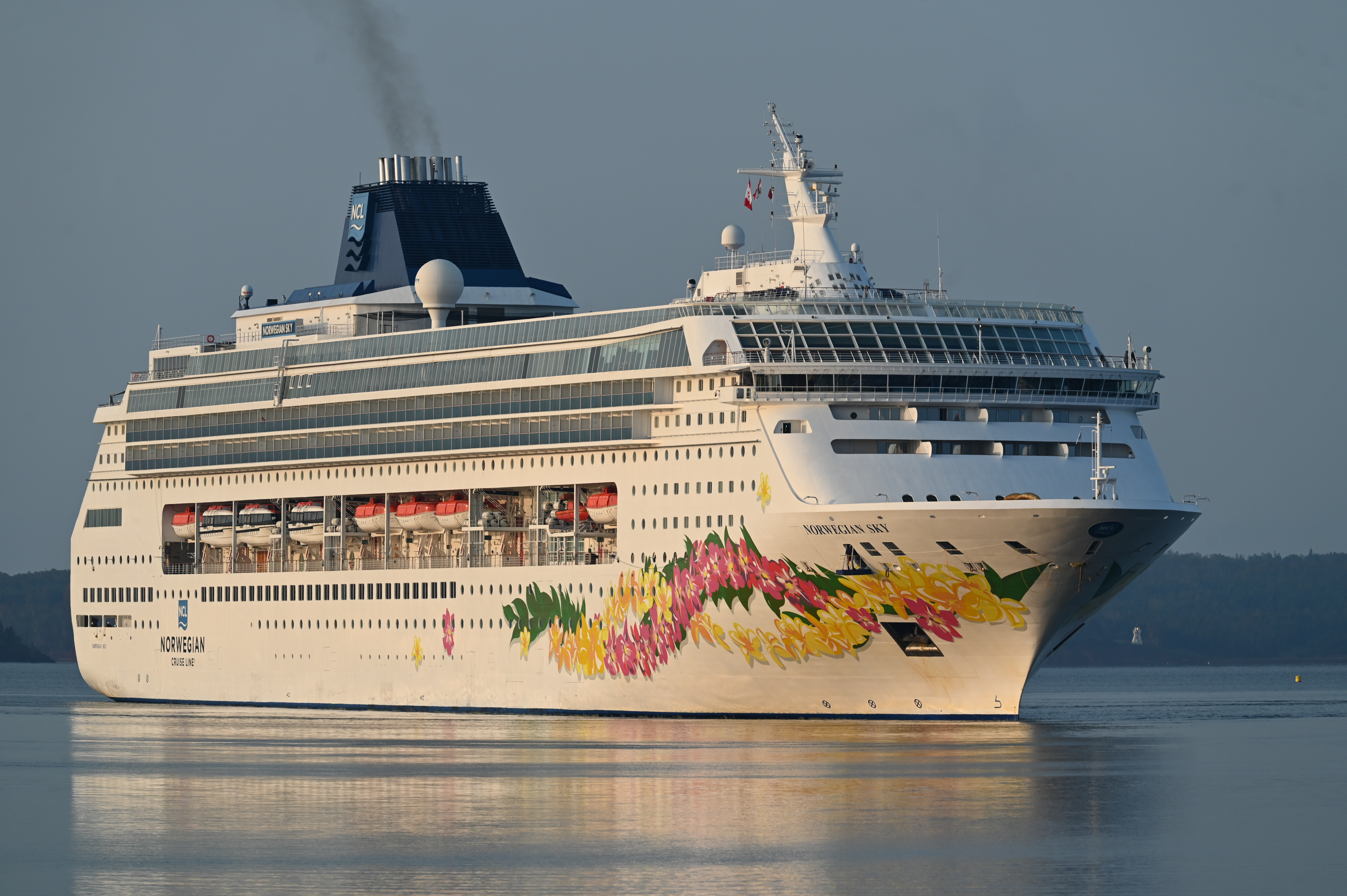
- Norwegian Sky in Charlottetown, Prince Edward Island

History

Bahamas
- Name: Costa Olympia (Construction only 1995-1998); Norwegian Sky (1998–2004); Pride of Aloha (2004–2008); Norwegian Sky (2008–2026); Sky (2026)
- Owner: Costa Cruises (Construction only 1995-1996); Bremer Vulkan (Construction only 1996-1997); Lloyd Werft (Construction only 1997-1999); Norwegian Cruise Line (1999–2008); Genting Hong Kong (2008–2012); Norwegian Cruise Line Holdings (2012–present)
- Operator: Norwegian Cruise Line (1999–2004); NCL America (2004–2008); Norwegian Cruise Line (2008–2026); Cordelia Cruises (2026)
- Port of registry: 1999–2004: Nassau, Bahamas; 2004–2008: Honolulu, United States; 2008 onwards: Nassau, Bahamas
- Ordered: December 1993
- Builder: Bremer Vulkan, Bremen, Germany (hull); Lloyd Werft, Bremerhaven, Germany
- Cost: US$357 million
- Yard number: 108
- Laid down: 1 September 1995
- Launched: October 6, 1996 (as Costa Olympia) (not completed)
- Christened: June 1999 (as Norwegian Sky)
- Acquired: July 29, 1999
- Maiden voyage: August 9, 1999
- In service: August 1999
- Identification: Call sign: C6PZ8; IMO number: 9128532; MMSI number: 308865000; DNV ID: 22371
- Status: In service

General characteristics (Note: Originally as Costa Olympia, partially constructed at the Bremer Vulkan shipyard. The construction was halted after Bremer Vulkan went bankrupt.)
- Tonnage: 77,104 GT
- Length: 253.6 m (832.0 ft)
- Beam: 32 m (105.0 ft)
- Height: 59.5 m (195.2 ft)
- Draught: 8.017 m (26.3 ft)
- Decks: 12
- Installed power: Three MAN B&W 6L58/64 and three 7L58/64 Diesel generators, 50.7 MW total
- Propulsion: Diesel-electric propulsion with two 5.5m diameter controllable-pitch propellers
- Speed: 23 knots (43 km/h; 26 mph)
- Capacity: 1,928 Passengers
- Crew: 766

General characteristics (Note: As Norwegian Sky, completed at Lloyd Werft)
- Class & type: Victoria-class cruise ship
- Tonnage: 77,104 GT
- Length: 848 ft (258.5 m)
- Beam: 123 ft (37.5 m)
- Draught: 26 ft (7.9 m)
- Decks: 13
- Capacity: 2,004 passengers (2,450 max) in 1002 cabins
- Crew: 899

Norwegian Sky is a Victoria-class cruise ship owned and operated by Norwegian Cruise Line. She was originally ordered by Costa Cruises as Costa Olympia, (sister of Costa Victoria) from the Bremer Vulkan shipyard in Germany, but she was completed in 1999 by the Lloyd Werft shipyard in Bremerhaven, Germany for the Norwegian Cruise Line under the name Norwegian Sky. Between 2004 and 2008, she sailed as Pride of Aloha for NCL America.

== Concept and construction ==
The ship that eventually became known as Norwegian Sky was originally ordered in December 1993 by Costa Cruises from the Bremer Vulkan shipyard as yard number 108 in Bremen, Germany as the second in a pair of sister ships. The first sister, Costa Victoria, was delivered on July 10, 1996. Construction of the second sister, Costa Olympia, had started several months before, but by July 1996, Bremer Vulkan was experiencing severe financial difficulties, and work on Costa Olympia was suspended when only 35% of the ship was completed. On October 6, 1996, the incomplete hull was launched, floated out of drydock and subsequently laid up.

Costa Cruises decided not to purchase the unfinished ship, and Costa Olympia remained laid up at Bremer Vulkan until December 1997, when Norwegian Cruise Line (NCL) purchased her. Costa Olympia was redesigned as Norwegian Sky by Tillberg Design (who had also been responsible for her original planned design as Costa Olympia). On March 8, 1998, the ship was towed to Lloyd Werft in Bremerhaven, Germany where her construction was completed. In fact, the ship retained the yard number of 108 under special circumstances. In 1998, NCL ordered two additional ships of Norwegian Sky design. The first of these was delivered in 2001 as Norwegian Sun while the order for the second one was cancelled. Norwegian Sky underwent her sea trials on July 17, 1999, and was delivered to NCL on July 28, 1999.

== Service history ==
Norwegian Sky entered service and made her maiden voyage for Norwegian Cruise Line on August 9, 1999, with a cruise from Dover, United Kingdom to Norway. After a period of financial difficulties, she was the first new ship to enter service with NCL in six years.

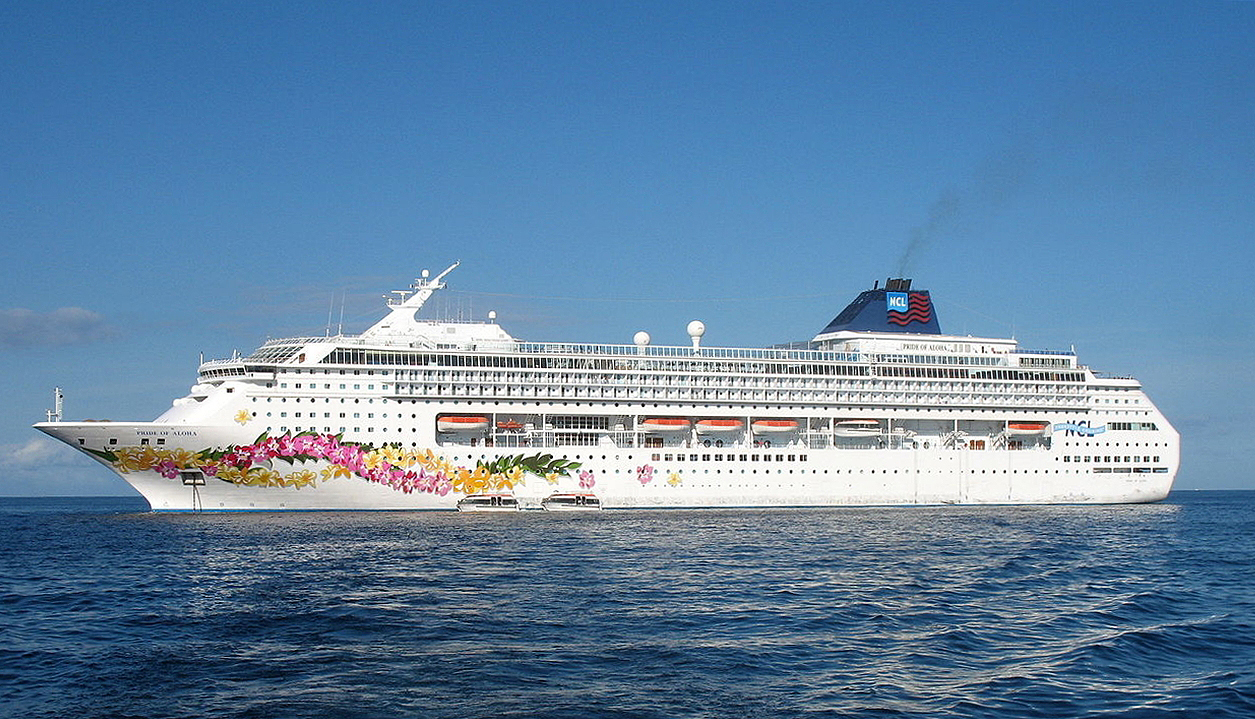
Pride of Aloha in Cozumel, Mexico

After four years of service, NCL announced she would be moved to its new NCL America division as Pride of Aloha in October 2004. Originally she was planned to be preceded by the purpose-built Pride of America in NCL America service, but a rogue storm damaged Pride of America during construction at Lloyd Werft and Pride of Aloha had to be rushed into service instead. In May 2004, Norwegian Sky entered drydock in San Francisco, re-emerging as Pride of Aloha on July 4, 2004. Pride of Aloha was re-christened by Mrs. Margaret Awamura Inouye, the wife of Hawaiian senator Daniel K. Inouye.

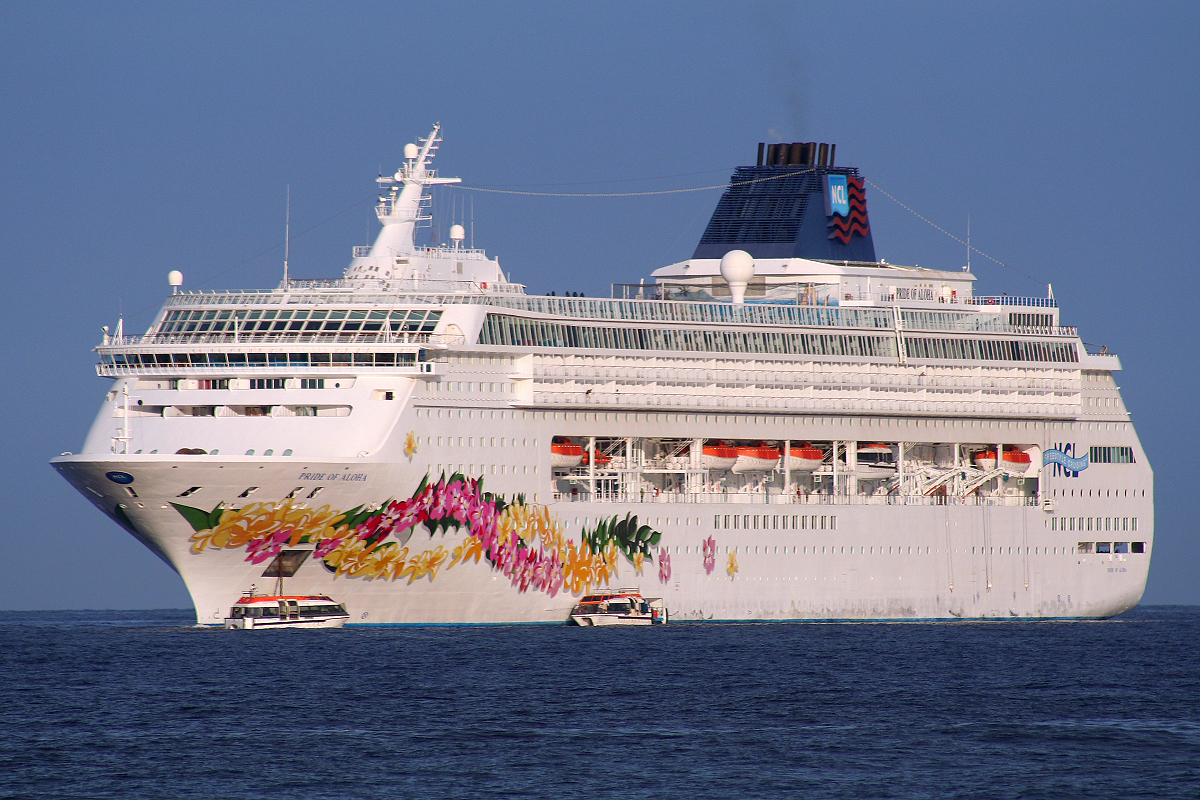
Pride of Aloha in Hawaiian waters

Being a U.S.-flagged vessel, Pride of Aloha required a crew of U.S. citizens. This made for a difficult launch as there was no established labor market to tap into. The first few months of sailings were plagued by poor service, crewmembers quitting and walking off the ship while in port, and an enormous number of customer complaints. NCL initiated a new and aggressive training program to better prepare newly hired employees for life aboard a cruise vessel. Subsequently, the training for all employees took place at the Paul Hall Center for Maritime Training and Education, a Maritime School in Piney Point, Maryland. Passenger satisfaction improved substantially since the introduction of the new training program.

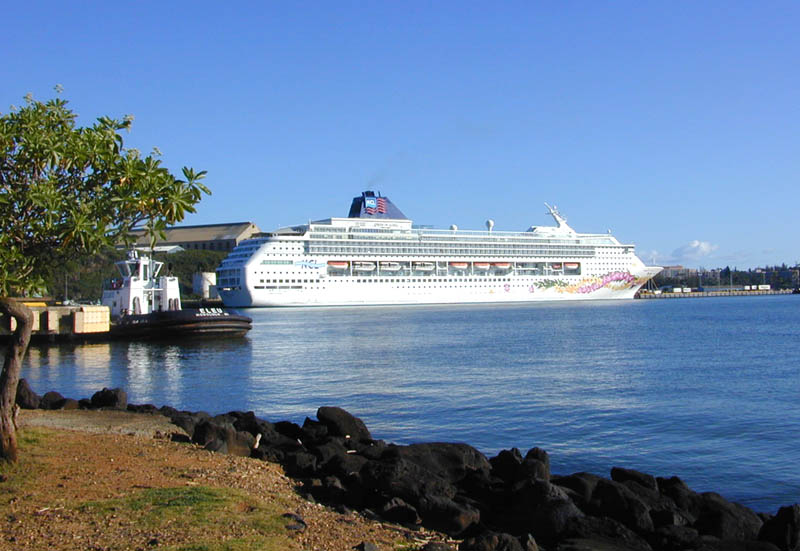
Pride of Aloha in Kauai, Hawaii.

On February 11, 2008, NCL announced that Pride of Aloha would be withdrawn from the Hawaiian market as of May 5, 2008. Initially it was reported that she would be transferred to the fleet of Star Cruises. During April 2008, Lloyd's List reported that NCL was looking to sell her to the Spain-based Royal Caribbean Group subsidiary Pullmantur Cruises instead, but Pullmantur Cruises later withdrew their offer. In May 2008 NCL reported that instead of transferring to Star Cruises, the ship would return to Norwegian Cruise Line and be re-flagged to the Bahamas while reverting to her original name Norwegian Sky with the first sailing July 14, 2008.

In January 2009, Norwegian Sky was sold to Ample Avenue, a subsidiary of Genting Hong Kong, and chartered back to NCL on a bareboat charter. In July 2010, the charter agreement was extended. The new agreement included options for NCL to extend the charter period further and an option for NCL to purchase the ship during the charter period. On June 1, 2012, NCL announced the signing of a memorandum of agreement to exercise its option to purchase Norwegian Sky. The purchase price was approximately $260 million, with financing being provided by the seller.

Hurricane Irma caused cruises to be cancelled; afterwards Norwegian Sky evacuated almost 2,000 travelers from St. Thomas and took them to Miami.

On April 7, 2025, it was announced Norwegian Sky, along with her sister ship Norwegian Sun would be put on a long-term charter to Cordelia Cruises. Norwegian Sky will transfer out of the Norwegian fleet in late 2026. The Cordelia Sky will enter service in late September 2026. It was the first ship in 17 years to leave the Norwegian fleet.

As at September 2026, it was undergoing a refit in Turkey.

== Design ==
As originally planned, Costa Olympia would have had an exterior and interior design identical to Costa Victoria. Following the acquisition by Norwegian Cruise Line, she was radically redesigned. Design changes included two decks of balcony cabins (opposed to no balcony cabins in the original plans), three additional restaurants, entirely altered decor and moving the bridge down by one deck to accommodate an observation lounge/spa complex on the topmost deck. Both the original and revised plans were the work of Tillberg Design.

When the ship was refitted for service as Pride of Aloha she received hull art consisting of colorful Hawaiian leis.

Prior to being rechristened, the Pride of Aloha was not allowed to have a casino given the fact that it was mainly in US waters. Instead of a casino, the ship had the Kumu Cultural Center. This focused on three main themes - Everyday life in Ancient Hawai`i, the Hawaiian Kingdom and Contemporary Hawai'i.

When the Pride of Aloha was rechristened back to Norwegian Sky, the casino was reinstated but she retained her livery.

== Ports of call ==
Norwegian Sky is currently sailing three- and four-night cruises from Miami to the Bahamas with stops at Grand Bahama, Great Stirrup Cay, Freeport, and Nassau. The ship introduced a new concept starting in January 2016 and ending in June 2019 where alcohol was included in the cost, with an upcharge only for premium brands.

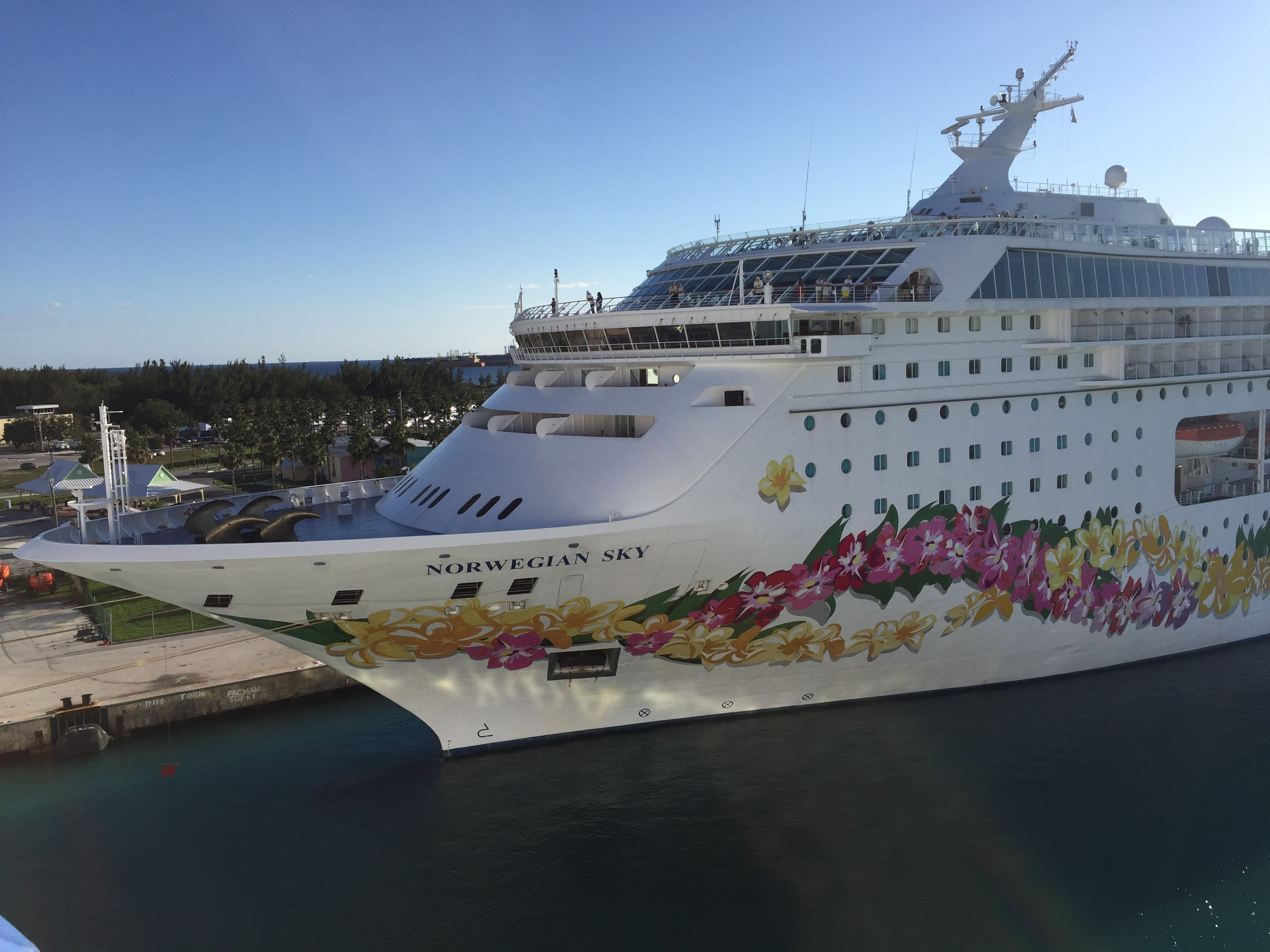
Norwegian Sky docked in Freeport, Bahamas, in February 2016.

=== Cuba ===
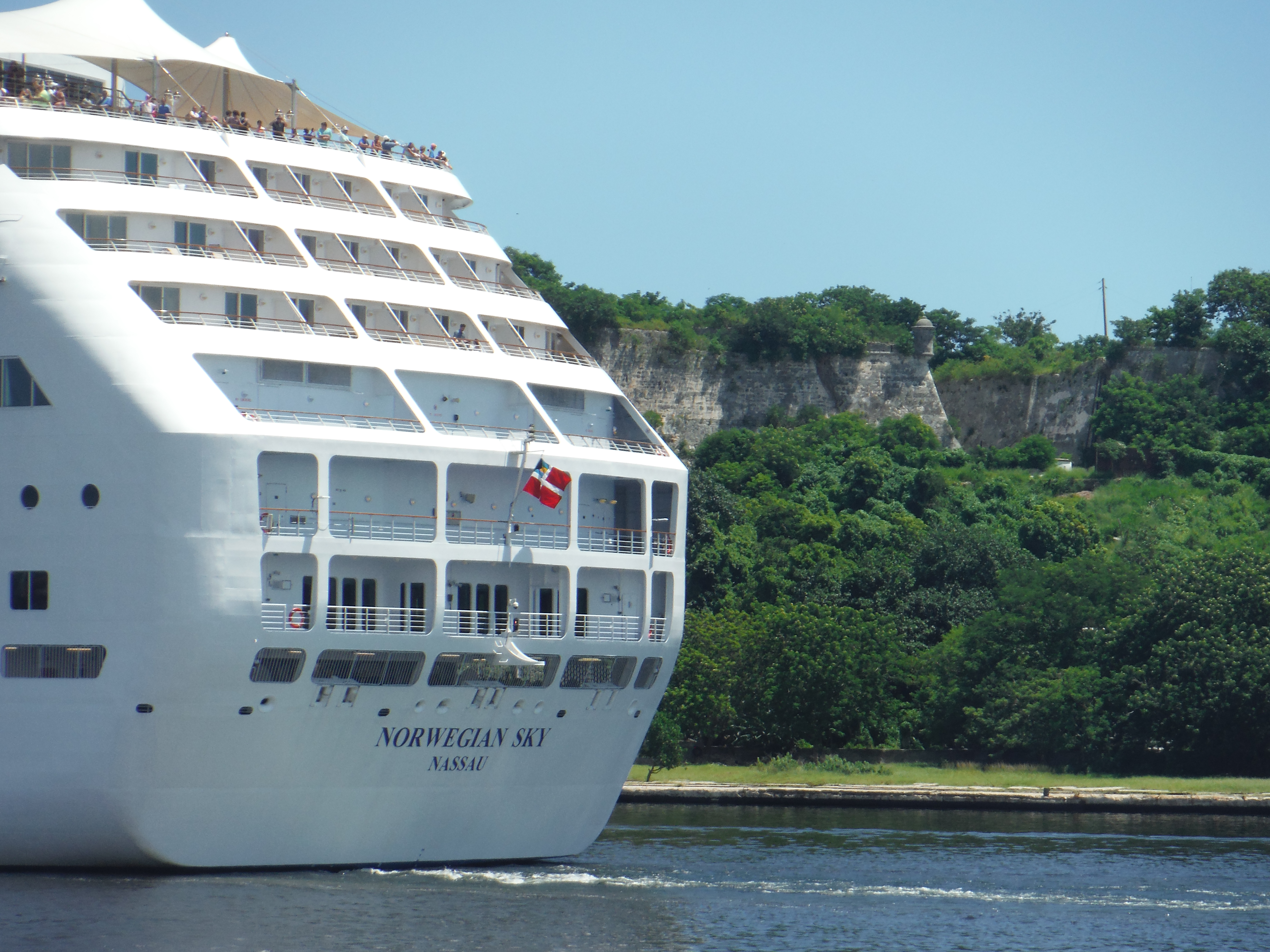
Norwegian Sky in Havana, Cuba.

Norwegian Sky was one of the first U.S.-based ships to visit Cuba.

== Accidents and incidents ==
While doing her inaugural cruise along the Eastern coast of the United States and Canada up to Québec City, Norwegian Sky temporarily ran aground in the Saguenay River on September 24, 1999. On its return to the mouth of the Saguenay, at about 11:30 local time, whales were observed in the St. Lawrence River. To prolong the whale-watching activity, the vessel was turned around but ran aground on the Bancs de l'île Rouge (Rouge Island Banks) before completing its maneuver. The vessel's stern made bottom contact with the shoal. The vessel slowed and the stern came to rest on the Bancs de l'île Rouge. At 12:06, the vessel was aground, listing 5.2º to port. As the vessel was unstable on the reef, the master requested assistance from the Canadian Coast Guard for a preventive evacuation of all passengers plus some crew members. The Marine Rescue Centre of Québec tasked different resources including whale-watching tour boats and the two provincial ferries normally crossing the Saguenay River. However, at the very last moment, with the assistance of a small Search and Rescue cutter and the high tide, Norwegian Sky was able to free herself from the reef and proceeded to deeper waters. The vessel sustained substantial damage, but pollution was deemed minor. No injuries resulted from this occurrence. The vessel returned to Québec City for major repairs in a local dry-dock taking over a month. As a result, three cruises had to be cancelled.

In May 2001, the autopilot on Norwegian Sky failed and caused it to make a jarring turn and then list, sending plates and glasses crashing and injuring more than 78 people. The malfunction, near the mouth of the Strait of Juan de Fuca, appeared to be the result of a computer error. Two serious injuries were the result of a video game machine falling on one passenger and another passenger suffering a broken pelvis when he was washed out of a pool due to the severe list.

After the 100-foot (30.5 m) fish tender Arctic Sun struck a rock and sank in Clarence Strait in the Alexander Archipelago in Southeast Alaska on July 26, 2002, and the three people on board abandoned ship in a 16-foot (4.9 m) skiff, Norwegian Sky rescued them from the skiff and transported them to Ketchikan, Alaska.
