= SM U-77 =

History

German Empire
- Name: U-77
- Ordered: 9 March 1915
- Builder: AG Vulkan, Hamburg
- Yard number: 59
- Launched: 9 January 1916
- Commissioned: 10 March 1916
- Fate: Missing since 7 July 1916 during a minelaying mission off Kinnaird Head, Scotland. 33 dead (all hands lost).

General characteristics
- Class & type: Type UE I submarine
- Displacement: 755 t (743 long tons) surfaced; 832 t (819 long tons) submerged
- Length: 56.80 m (186 ft 4 in) (o/a); 46.66 m (153 ft 1 in) (pressure hull)
- Beam: 5.90 m (19 ft 4 in) (o/a); 5.00 m (16 ft 5 in) (pressure hull)
- Height: 8.25 m (27 ft 1 in)
- Draught: 4.86 m (15 ft 11 in)
- Installed power: 2 × 900 PS (662 kW; 888 shp) surfaced; 2 × 800 PS (588 kW; 789 shp) submerged
- Propulsion: 2 shafts, 2× 1.41 m (4 ft 8 in) propellers
- Speed: 9.9 knots (18.3 km/h; 11.4 mph) surfaced; 7.9 knots (14.6 km/h; 9.1 mph) submerged
- Range: 7,880 nmi (14,590 km; 9,070 mi) at 7 knots (13 km/h; 8.1 mph) surfaced; 83 nmi (154 km; 96 mi) at 4 knots (7.4 km/h; 4.6 mph) submerged
- Test depth: 50 m (164 ft 1 in)
- Complement: 4 officers, 28 enlisted
- Armament: 2 × 50 cm (19.7 in) torpedo tubes (one port bow, one starbord stern); 4 torpedoes; 1 × 8.8 cm (3.5 in) SK L/30 deck gun

Service record
- Part of: I Flotilla; 29 June – 7 July 1916
- Commanders: Kptlt. Erich Günzel; 10 March – 7 July 1916
- Operations: 2 patrols
- Victories: No ships sunk or damaged

SM U-77 (Note: "SM" stands for "Seiner Majestät" (English: His Majesty's) and combined with the U for Unterseeboot would be translated as His Majesty's Submarine.) was one of 329 submarines serving in the Imperial German Navy in World War I, engaged in commerce warfare during the First Battle of the Atlantic.

== Design ==
Type UE I submarines were preceded by the longer Type U 66 submarines. U-77 had a displacement of 755 tonnes (743 long tons) when at the surface and 832 tonnes (819 long tons) while submerged. She had a total length of 56.80 m (186 ft 4 in), a pressure hull length of 46.66 m (153 ft 1 in), a beam of 5.90 m (19 ft 4 in), a height of 8.25 m (27 ft 1 in), and a draught of 4.86 m (15 ft 11 in). The submarine was powered by two 900 metric horsepower (660 kW; 890 shp) engines for use while surfaced, and two 900 metric horsepower (660 kW; 890 shp) engines for use while submerged. She had two propeller shafts. She was capable of operating at depths of up to 50 metres (160 ft).

The submarine had a maximum surface speed of 9.9 knots (18.3 km/h; 11.4 mph) and a maximum submerged speed of 7.9 knots (14.6 km/h; 9.1 mph). When submerged, she could operate for 83 nautical miles (154 km; 96 mi) at 4 knots (7.4 km/h; 4.6 mph); when surfaced, she could travel 7,880 nautical miles (14,590 km; 9,070 mi) at 7 knots (13 km/h; 8.1 mph). U-77 was fitted with two 50 centimetres (20 in) torpedo tubes (one at the port bow and one starboard stern), four torpedoes, and one 8.8 centimetres (3.46 in) deck gun. She had a complement of thirty-two (twenty-eight crew members and four officers).

== Operations ==
U-77 was commanded by Kaptlt Erich Günzel, who was lost with her. She came off the stocks at Hamburg (Vulcan) in 1916; in May and June was at Kiel School, and first entered North Sea with U-76 on 29 June, to join the 1st Half Flotilla.

- 5 July 1916. Left for the north, and laid mines between about 57°45′N 2°12′W and 57°47′N 2°23′W. It seems possible she sank in 57°35′N 1°27′W before midnight 7 July 1916 as a result of some accident. Before this she had laid mines off Kinnaird Head.

== Previously recorded fate ==
U-77 was thought to have sunk off Dunbar, Scotland in May 1916 as a result of a mine handling accident. The submarine involved was actually U-74.

== Bibliography ==
- Gröner, Erich; Jung, Dieter; Maass, Martin (1991). U-boats and Mine Warfare Vessels. German Warships 1815–1945. Vol. 2. Translated by Thomas, Keith; Magowan, Rachel. London: Conway Maritime Press. ISBN 0-85177-593-4.
