= Empress of the Seas =

Cruise ship operated by Royal Caribbean International

- MS Empress, Ex (Royal Caribbean International) Empress of the Seas

History

Bahamas
- Name: Originally ordered as: Future Seas (1989–1990); 1990–2004: Nordic Empress; 2004–2008: Empress of the Seas; 2008–2016: Empress; 2016–2020: Empress of the Seas; 2020–present: Empress
- Owner: 1990–2020: Royal Caribbean Group; 2020–present: Cordelia Cruises
- Operator: 1989–1989: Admiral Cruises (Only in the construction); 1990–1990: Royal Admiral Cruises (Only in the construction); 1990–2008: Royal Caribbean International; 2008–2016: Pullmantur Cruises; 2016–2020: Royal Caribbean International; 2020–present: Cordelia Cruises
- Port of registry: 1990–2002: Monrovia, Liberia; 2002–2008: Nassau, Bahamas; 2008–2016: Valletta, Malta; 2016–present: Nassau, Bahamas
- Builder: Chantiers de l'Atlantique, Saint-Nazaire, France
- Yard number: G29
- Launched: 25 August 1989
- Sponsored by: Gloria Estefan
- Acquired: 31 May 1990
- Maiden voyage: 25 June 1990
- In service: 2020–present
- Home port: Mumbai, India
- Identification: IMO number: 8716899
- Status: In Service

General characteristics (as built)
- Type: Empress-class cruise ship
- Tonnage: 48,563 GT; 5,344 DWT
- Length: 210.81 m (691.63 ft)
- Beam: 30.70 m (100.72 ft)
- Draught: 7.10 m (23.29 ft)
- Decks: 9 Passenger Decks
- Installed power: 2 × Wärtsilä-Duvant Crepelle diesels; combined 16,200 kW
- Speed: 19.5 knots (36.1 km/h; 22.4 mph)
- Capacity: 1,640
- Crew: 668

Empress (formerly Nordic Empress and Empress of the Seas) is a cruise ship owned by Cordelia Cruises, an Indian cruise line. She is the sole ship of her class. She entered service with then-Royal Caribbean International in 1990, transferred to Pullmantur Cruises in 2008, and then returned to Royal Caribbean International in 2016. In December 2020, she was retired from the Royal Caribbean fleet and sold to Cordelia Cruises.

== History ==
The ship was ordered by Admiral Cruises and was intended to be called the Future Seas and join the other Admiral ships, the Azure Seas and the Emerald Seas. However, when Royal Caribbean merged with Admiral in 1987, the Admiral brand was dissolved and the newbuild (still under construction) was incorporated into the Royal Caribbean fleet. A few signature Royal Caribbean brand elements were added, including the Viking Crown and Windjammer Cafe.

The ship was originally named Nordic Empress and was the final Royal Caribbean ship whose name did not end with "of the Seas" until the name was changed to match the rest of the fleet following an extensive rebuilding that ended on 8 May 2004.

Nordic Empress was the first mainstream cruise ship especially designed for the 3 and 4 day cruise market. Her initial itinerary was a short cruise to the Bahamas, which was then combined with 3 and 4 day cruises from San Juan, Puerto Rico. In 1999, following the sale of the Song of America, the Nordic Empress took over the New York City to Bermuda route.

In 2000, Royal Caribbean announced that the Nordic Empress would be undertaking a series of cruises in South America. Shortly after these cruises were put on sale, Royal Caribbean decided to replace the Nordic Empress with the Splendour of the Seas on the South American itineraries, leaving the Nordic Empress in the Caribbean.

=== 2001 engine room fire ===
In June 2001 the Nordic Empress suffered extensive engine room fire damage while sailing 140 miles north of Bermuda. Subsequent investigation revealed the cause of the fire was failure of a loose bolt in a fuel line flange assembly that had been improperly repaired. The broken bolt caused the flange assembly to separate, allowing fuel to leak around the engine. Moments after a low fuel pressure alarm sounded in the engine room, the leaking fuel ignited against the hot engine surfaces, causing a large explosion that was visible on the engine room CCTV. The engines were stopped immediately and all fuel pumps switched off. Crew members attempting to enter the engine area to fight to fire with fire hoses were forced to turn back from the intense heat. 6 minutes into the fire, the engine room overhead fire sprinkler system was activated along with the ship's general emergency alarm. The sprinklers appeared to have extinguished the fire after 4 minutes, and crew once again attempted to re-enter the engine area, only to have the residual fuel in the engine area ignite a flash fire that was quickly extinguished with fire hoses. During the subsequent inspection of the engine room and surrounding areas, burning wires were discovered in an adjacent compartment. The space was evacuated before lowering watertight doors and releasing 885 kg of halon and restarting the overhead sprinkler system. 3 hours after the first fire broke out, the incident was logged as resolved. The ship was able to return to Bermuda under reduced power, and was subsequently taken out of service for 2 weeks for repairs. Total expenses and lost revenue related to the fire totaled over $8.8 million.

Actress Tina Fey and then recently married husband Jeff Richmond were reportedly on board at the time. The incident was recounted in Fey's autobiography, Bossypants.

=== Service under Pullmantur Cruises ===
On 26 March 2007, it was reported that in March 2008, the Empress of the Seas would be transferred to the fleet of Royal Caribbean's subsidiary Pullmantur Cruises. Her final voyage for Royal Caribbean took place on 7 March 2008, while the maiden voyage as Empress for Pullmantur Cruises took place on 15 March 2008.

In November 2012, Empress was the first of the fleet to receive a brand new logo as well as new hull color scheme.

=== Service under Royal Caribbean ===
In 2016, Empress underwent a dry dock refit and returned to Royal Caribbean as Empress of the Seas.

On 21 December 2015, Royal Caribbean started offering 4- and 5-night Empress of the Seas cruises from Miami, originally scheduled to begin 30 March 2016, with the Bahama Islands, Key West, and Grand Cayman among ports to be visited. On 18 March 2016, Royal Caribbean announced that the reintroduction of Empress of the Seas into its fleet would be delayed until 25 April 2016. On 20 April 2016, a further delay to 28 May 2016 was announced to time to completely rebuild the ship's galleys.

On 21 December 2018, Empress of the Seas rescued two fishermen who were without food, fuel or water after having set sail in the Caribbean sea twenty days earlier. Crew members operating the radar system for the Empress of the Seas had noticed an anomaly that turned out to be the small fishing boat. Royal Caribbean lowered one of its lifeboats to rescue the fishermen.

In 2019, the ship was scheduled to take longer and more extended cruises to Cuba. Besides Havana, she was scheduled to visit Cienfuegos and Santiago de Cuba. These routes have since been suspended, the ship instead substituting other ports in the Caribbean and Bahama Islands for the Cuban ports.

On 15 March 2020 the ship docked in Miami for the final time under Royal Caribbean carrying fare paying passengers.

=== Sale to Cordelia Cruises ===
In August 2020, in response to rumors that Empress of the Seas was anchored in Greece to be sold for scrap, Royal Caribbean said that the ship was still part of the fleet and would only be staying in Greece for a few months.

In December 2020, Royal Caribbean sold Empress of the Seas to Indian cruise line Cordelia Cruises.

== In popular culture ==
In the novel World War Z, by Max Brooks, the Nordic Empress is found to be heavily infested by zombies and drifting near Dakar, Senegal by the Chinese Type 094 submarine Admiral Zheng He.

== Gallery ==
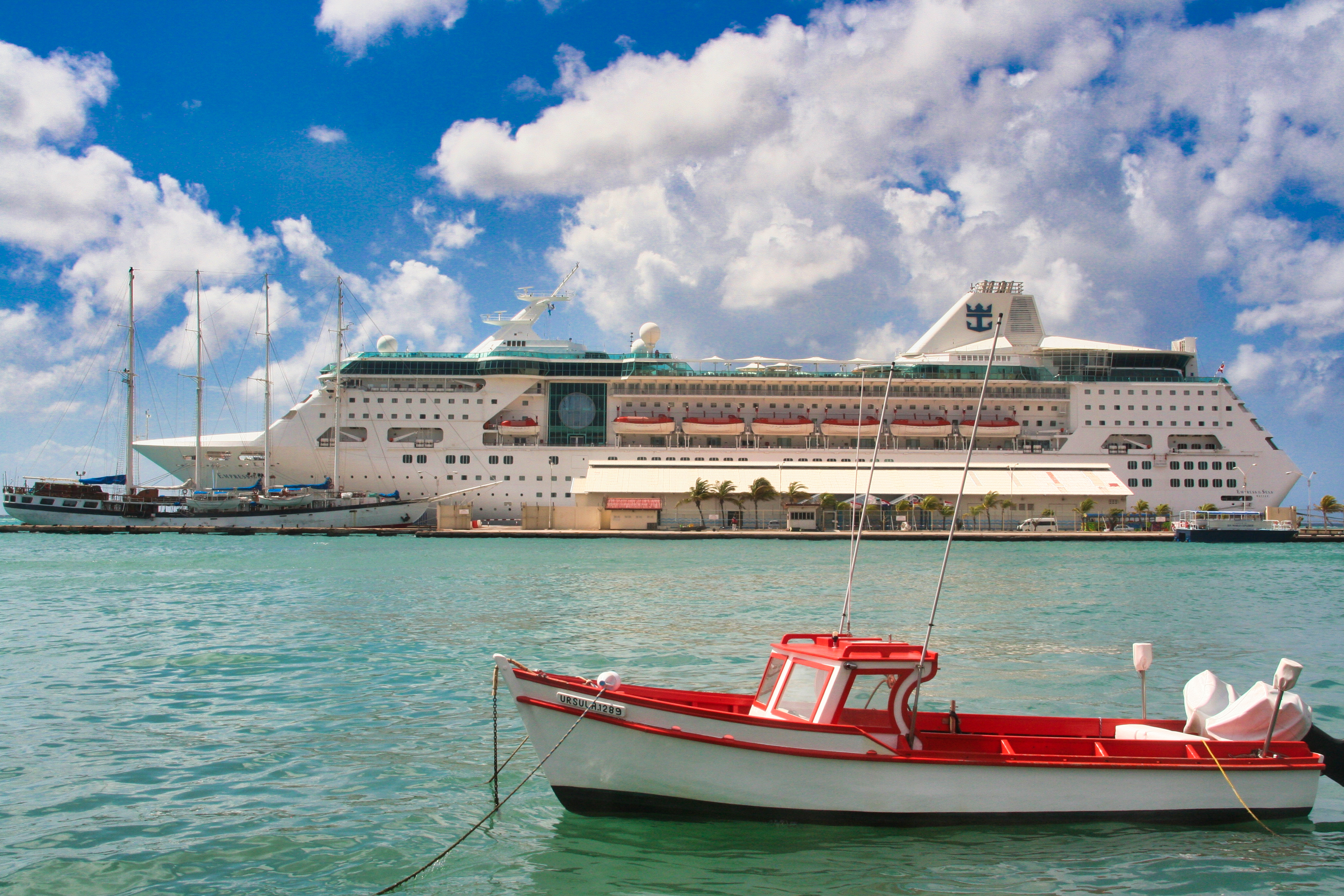
MS Empress Of The Seas

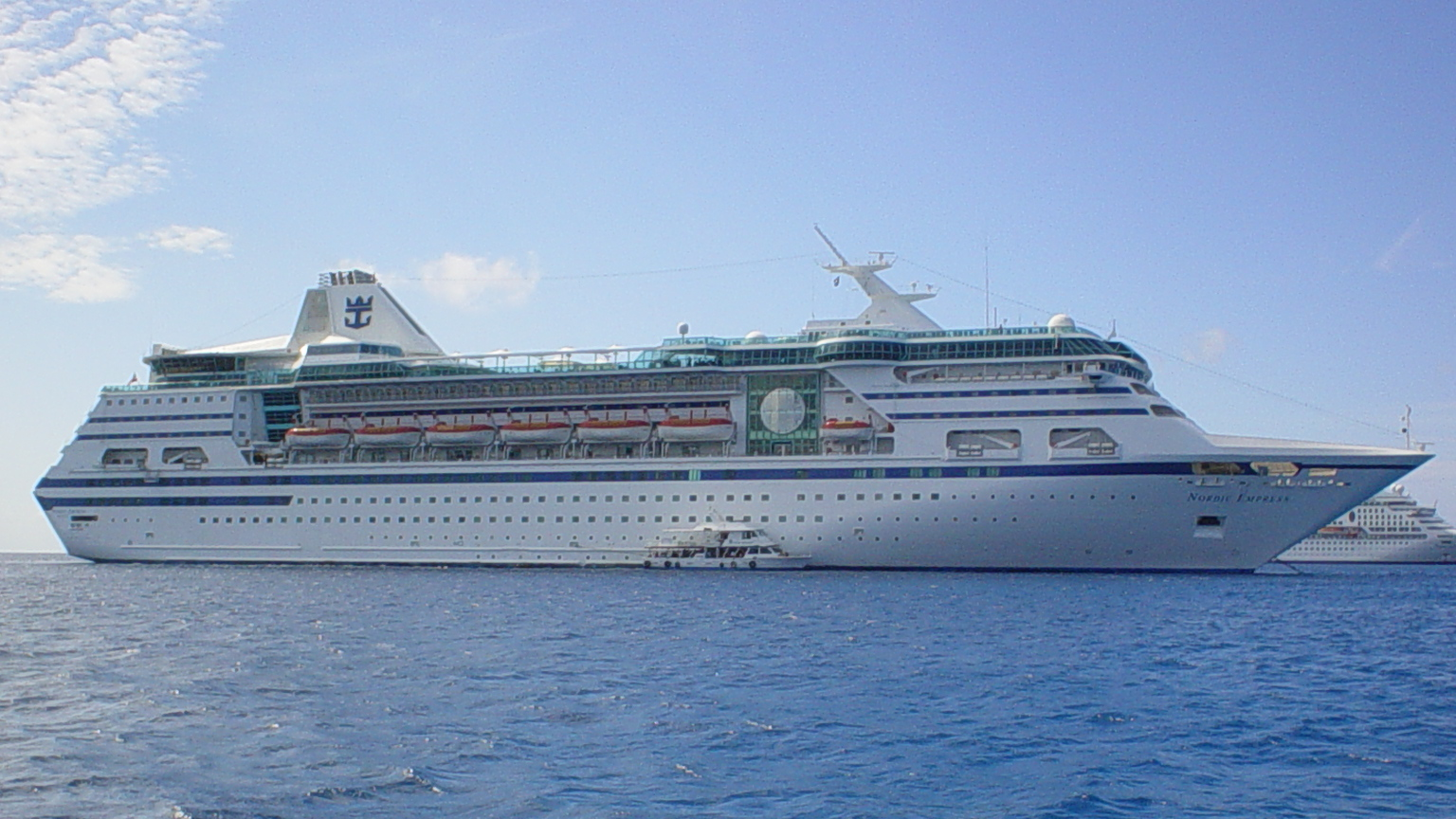
MS Nordic Empress, featuring her original Royal Caribbean livery, anchored off the Cayman Islands in March 2004

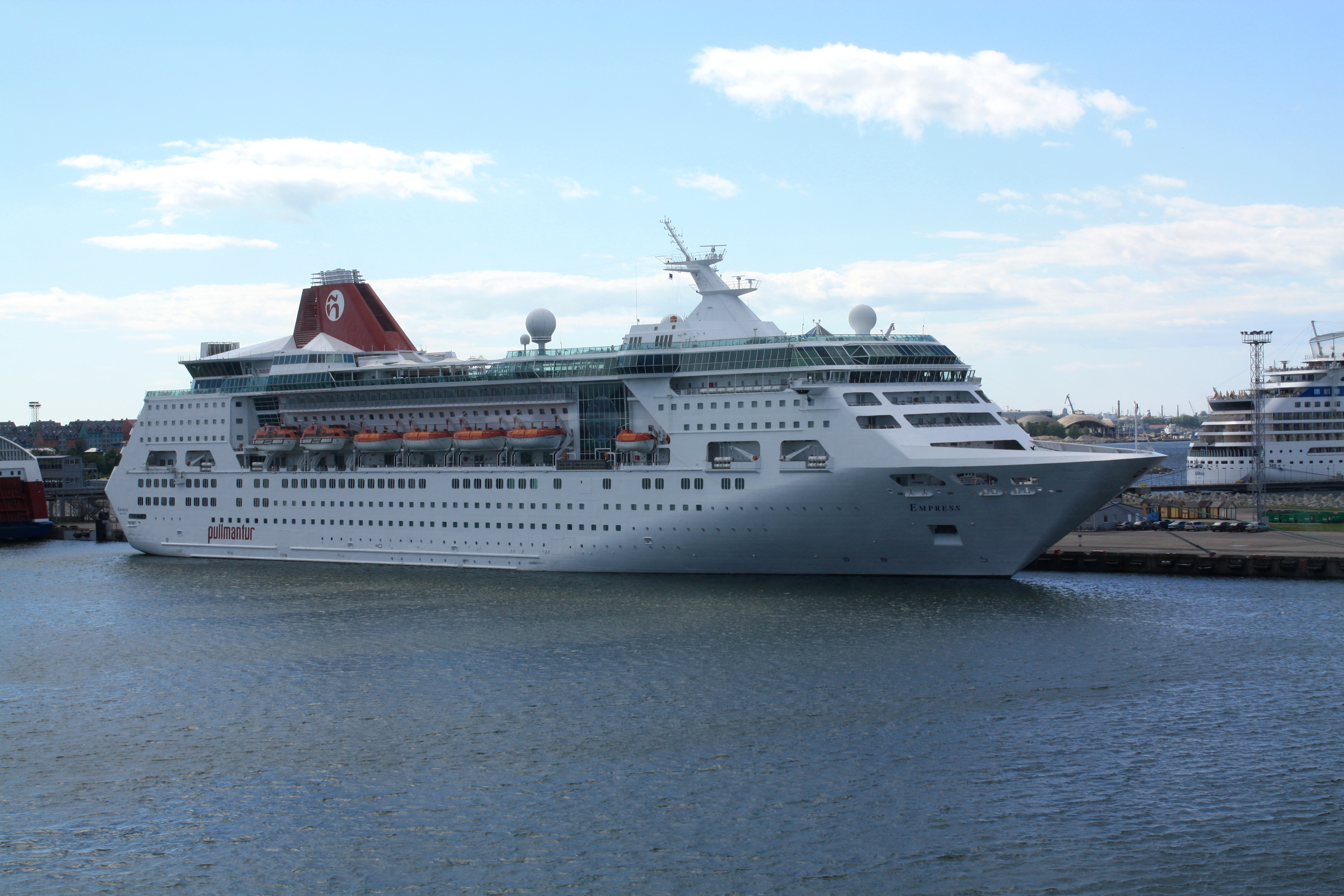
MS Empress, in her original Pullmantur livery, docked in Tallinn, Estonia in June 2010

MS Empress, in Tallinn, Estonia in June 2013

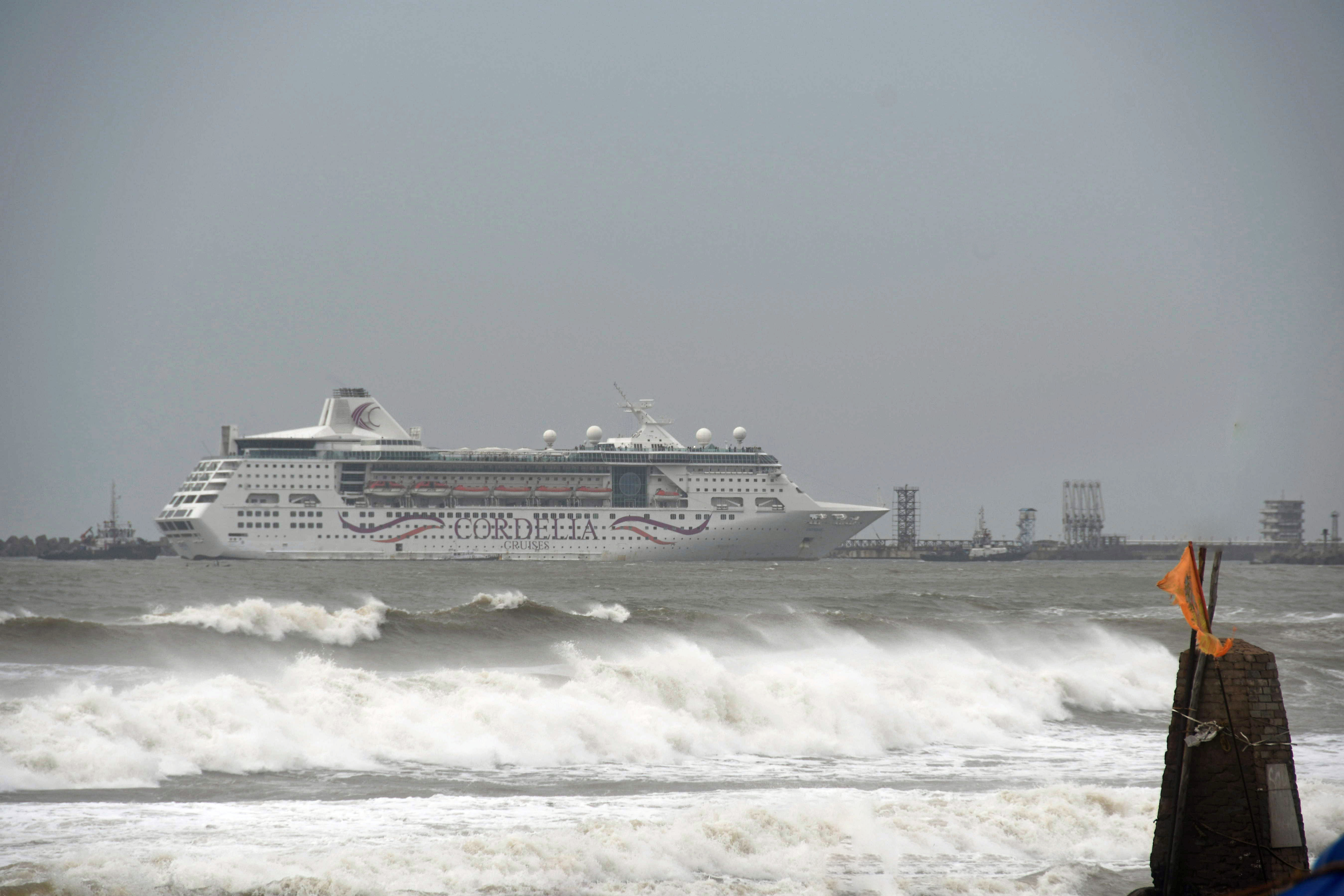
MS Empress, in her Cordelia Cruises livery in August 2022
