= SM U-76 =

History

German Empire
- Name: U-76
- Ordered: 9 March 1915
- Builder: AG Vulkan, Hamburg
- Yard number: 58
- Launched: 12 March 1916
- Commissioned: 11 May 1916
- Fate: 22 January 1917 - Foundered in bad weather off North Cape 71°N 23°E after damage by collision with a Russian trawler. 1 dead, unknown number of survivors.

General characteristics
- Class & type: Type UE I submarine
- Displacement: 755 t (743 long tons) surfaced; 832 t (819 long tons) submerged
- Length: 56.80 m (186 ft 4 in) (o/a); 46.66 m (153 ft 1 in) (pressure hull)
- Beam: 5.90 m (19 ft 4 in) (o/a); 5.00 m (16 ft 5 in) (pressure hull)
- Height: 8.25 m (27 ft 1 in)
- Draught: 4.86 m (15 ft 11 in)
- Installed power: 2 × 900 PS (662 kW; 888 shp) surfaced; 2 × 800 PS (588 kW; 789 shp) submerged
- Propulsion: 2 shafts, 2× 1.38 m (4 ft 6 in) propellers
- Speed: 9.9 knots (18.3 km/h; 11.4 mph) surfaced; 7.8 knots (14.4 km/h; 9.0 mph) submerged
- Range: 7,880 nmi (14,590 km; 9,070 mi) at 7 knots (13 km/h; 8.1 mph) surfaced; 83 nmi (154 km; 96 mi) at 4 knots (7.4 km/h; 4.6 mph) submerged
- Test depth: 50 m (164 ft 1 in)
- Complement: 4 officers, 28 enlisted
- Armament: 2 × 50 cm (19.7 in) torpedo tubes (one port bow, one starbord stern); 4 torpedoes; 1 × 8.8 cm (3.5 in) SK L/30 deck gun

Service record
- Part of: I Flotilla; 29 June 1916 – 22 January 1917
- Commanders: Kptlt. Waldemar Bender; 11 May 1916 – 22 January 1917
- Operations: 4 patrols
- Victories: 2 merchant ships sunk (1,149 GRT + Unknown GRT); 1 merchant ship damaged (6,254 GRT)

SM U-76 (Note: "SM" stands for "Seiner Majestät" (English: His Majesty's) and combined with the U for Unterseeboot would be translated as His Majesty's Submarine.) was a Type UE 1 submarine and one of the 329 submarines serving in the Imperial German Navy in World War I. U-76 was engaged in the naval warfare and took part in the First Battle of the Atlantic.

== Design ==
Type UE I submarines were preceded by the longer Type U 66 submarines. U-76 had a displacement of 755 tonnes (743 long tons) when at the surface and 832 tonnes (819 long tons) while submerged. She had a total length of 56.80 m (186 ft 4 in), a pressure hull length of 46.66 m (153 ft 1 in), a beam of 5.90 m (19 ft 4 in), a height of 8.25 m (27 ft 1 in), and a draught of 4.86 m (15 ft 11 in). The submarine was powered by two 900 metric horsepower (660 kW; 890 shp) engines for use while surfaced, and two 800 metric horsepower (590 kW; 790 shp) engines for use while submerged. She had two propeller shafts. She was capable of operating at depths of up to 50 metres (160 ft).

The submarine had a maximum surface speed of 9.9 knots (18.3 km/h; 11.4 mph) and a maximum submerged speed of 7.8 knots (14.4 km/h; 9.0 mph). When submerged, she could operate for 83 nautical miles (154 km; 96 mi) at 4 knots (7.4 km/h; 4.6 mph); when surfaced, she could travel 7,880 nautical miles (14,590 km; 9,070 mi) at 7 knots (13 km/h; 8.1 mph). U-76 was fitted with two 50 centimetres (20 in) torpedo tubes (one at the port bow and one starboard stern), four torpedoes, and one 8.8 cm (3.5 in) SK L/30 deck gun. She had a complement of thirty-two (twenty-eight crew members and four officers).

== Summary of raiding history ==
Date	Name	Nationality	Tonnage (Note: Tonnages are in gross register tons)	Fate
17 October 1916	Botnia	Norway	1,149	Sunk
11 November 1916	Anna I	Russia	—N/a	Sunk
15 November 1916	Koursk	Russia	6,254	Damaged

== Bibliography ==
- Gröner, Erich; Jung, Dieter; Maass, Martin (1991). U-boats and Mine Warfare Vessels. German Warships 1815–1945. Vol. 2. Translated by Thomas, Keith; Magowan, Rachel. London: Conway Maritime Press. ISBN 0-85177-593-4.
