= Costa Victoria =

Former cruise ship operated by Costa Cruises

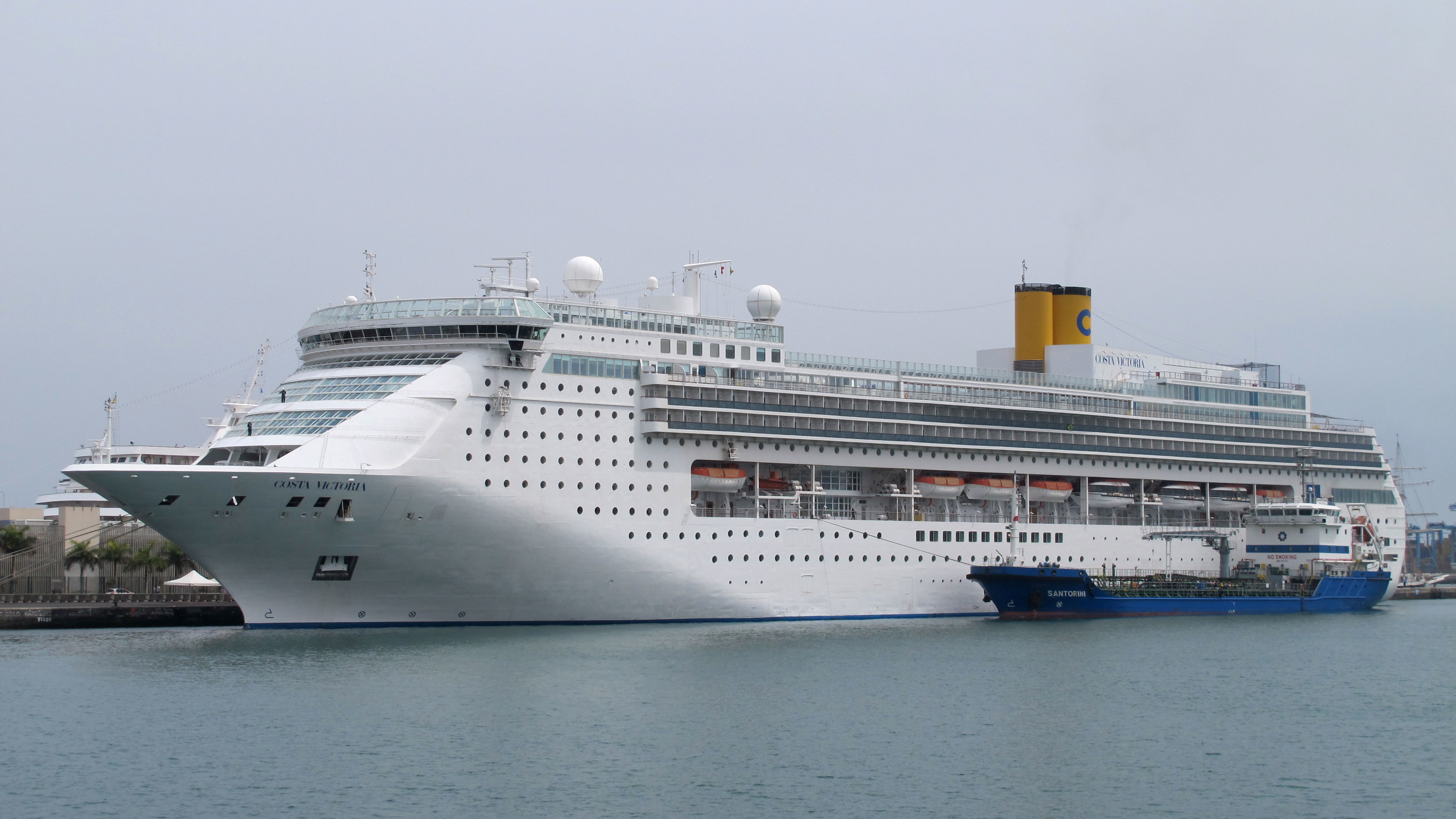
- Costa Victoria in 2012

History
- Name: Costa Victoria (1996–2021); St. Victoria (2021)
- Owner: Costa Crociere (1996–2020); Genova Trasporti Marittimi (2020); Piombino Industrie Marittime (2020–2021)
- Operator: Costa Crociere (1996–2020)
- Port of registry: Italy, Venice (1996–1997); Liberia, Monrovia (1997–2000); Italy, Genoa (2000–2021)
- Ordered: 1994
- Builder: Bremer Vulkan, Bremen, Germany
- Yard number: 107
- Launched: 2 September 1995
- Completed: 1996
- Acquired: 10 July 1996
- Maiden voyage: 28 July 1996
- In service: 1996
- Out of service: 25 March 2020
- Identification: Call sign: IBLC; IMO number: 9109031; MMSI number: 247109000
- Fate: Scrapped in Aliağa, Turkey, in 2021

General characteristics
- Class & type: Victoria-class cruise ship
- Tonnage: 75,166 GT; 43,277 NT; 8,039 DWT
- Length: 252 m (826 ft 9 in)
- Beam: 32.2 m (105 ft 8 in)
- Draught: 8.0 m (26 ft 3 in)
- Decks: 14
- Deck clearance: 3.207 m (10 ft 6.3 in)
- Speed: 24 knots (44 km/h; 28 mph)
- Capacity: 1,928 passengers (normal) 2,394 passengers (maximum)
- Crew: 766

Costa Victoria was a Victoria-class cruise ship launched in 1995 and operated by Costa Cruises, a subsidiary of Carnival Corporation, from 1996 until 2020. Built at Bremen, Germany, she was designed to reflect the spirit of Italy, which was enhanced in a 2013 refit. During her service with Costa she operated in many areas, including Asia. In June 2020, in light of the economic impact caused by the COVID-19 pandemic, Costa Victoria was moved to the Port of Piombino, Italy and decommissioned. She was sold in December 2020 for possible conversion to worker's accommodation at a Genoa shipyard, but resold for demolition in Turkey, where she arrived on 28 January 2021.

== Design and construction ==
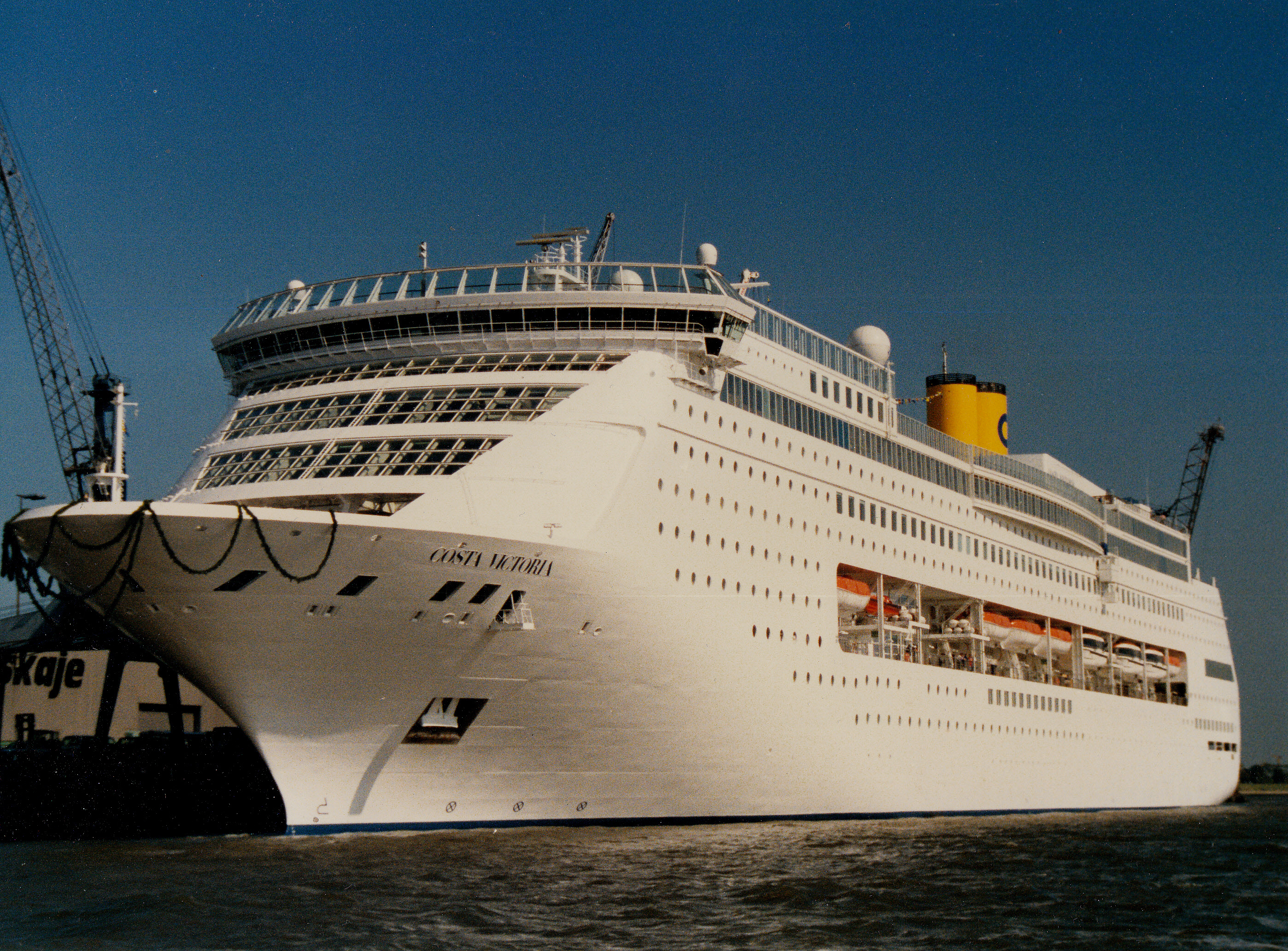
Costa Victoria in the Bremer Vulkan shipyard in 1996 just prior to her christening.

Costa Victoria was the first of two Victoria-class cruise ships ordered by Costa Cruises from the German shipyard Bremer Vulkan as its yard number 107 (the second was intended to become Costa Olympia, but was completed as Norwegian Cruise Line's Norwegian Sky). (Note: During the construction of Costa Olympia, the shipyard became bankrupt and her construction was halted. Costa Cruises declined to buy the unfinished hull and she was subsequently sold to Norwegian Cruise Line and she eventually entered service as Norwegian Sky, followed by Norwegian Sun, as the two-ship Sun class.) Costa Victoria was launched on 2 September 1995 and delivered on 15 July 1996. She was 252.9 m (829 ft 9 in) in length with a 36.1 m (118 ft 5 in) beam, had fourteen decks and was measured at 75,166 gross tonnage (GT). She had a diesel-electric power plant, which gave her an operating speed of up to 24 knots (44 km/h; 28 mph).

== Costa Cruises service ==
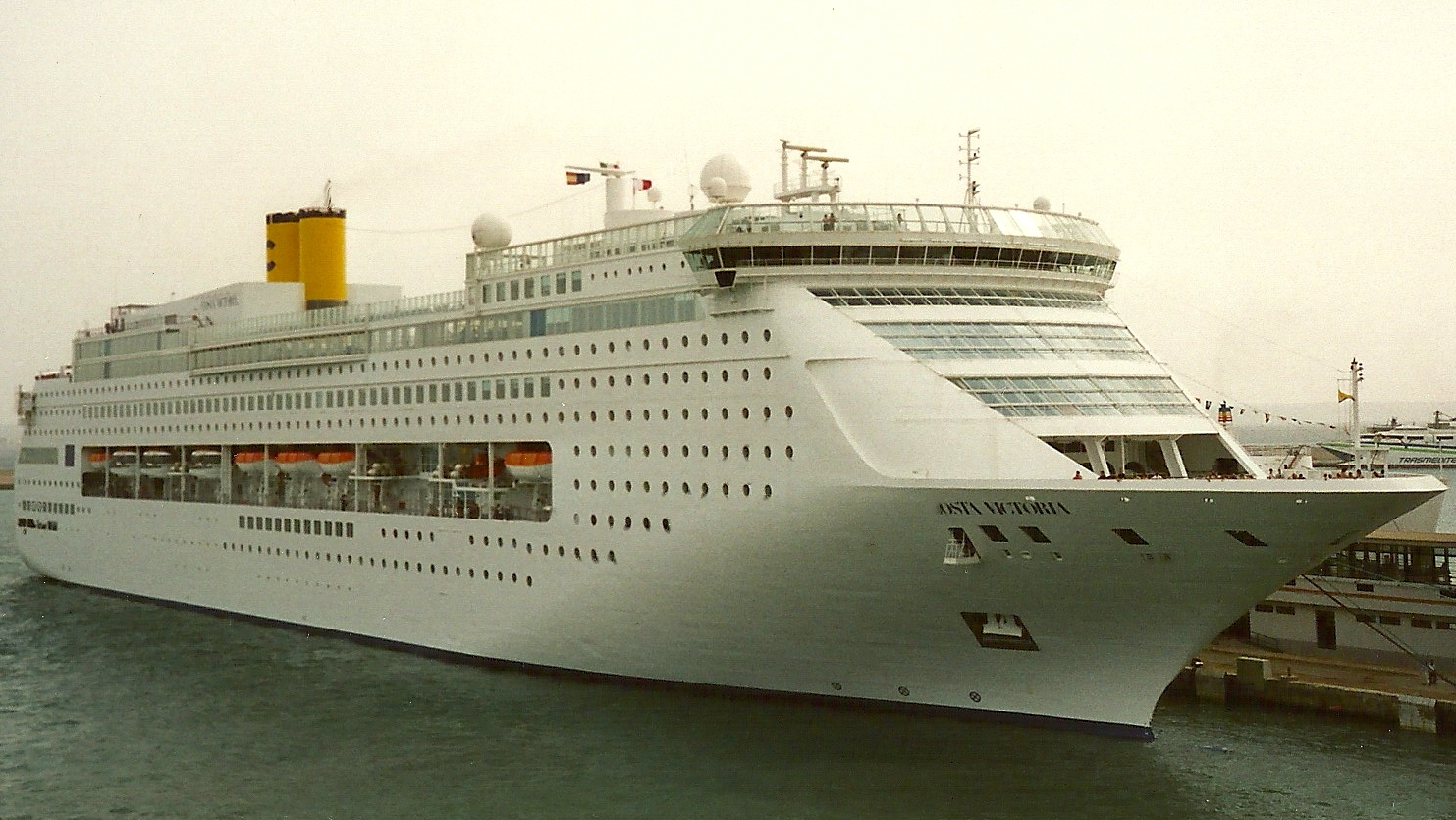
Costa Victoria in Mallorca, Spain in 2001.

The last new acquisition before Costa Cruises was taken over by Carnival Corporation and Airtours in 1997, Costa Victoria entered service in mid-1996 with a capacity for 2,394 passengers. In 2004, the ship underwent an extensive refit, which included balconies being added to 246 cabins. Costa Victoria underwent an additional refit in November 2013, in which public rooms were modernized and staterooms were remodeled to have a more "Italian" design.

Costa Victoria hosted athletes for Universiade event at Naples in July 2019 with over 1,900 athletes and 38 national delegations worldwide were accommodated to aboard the ship.

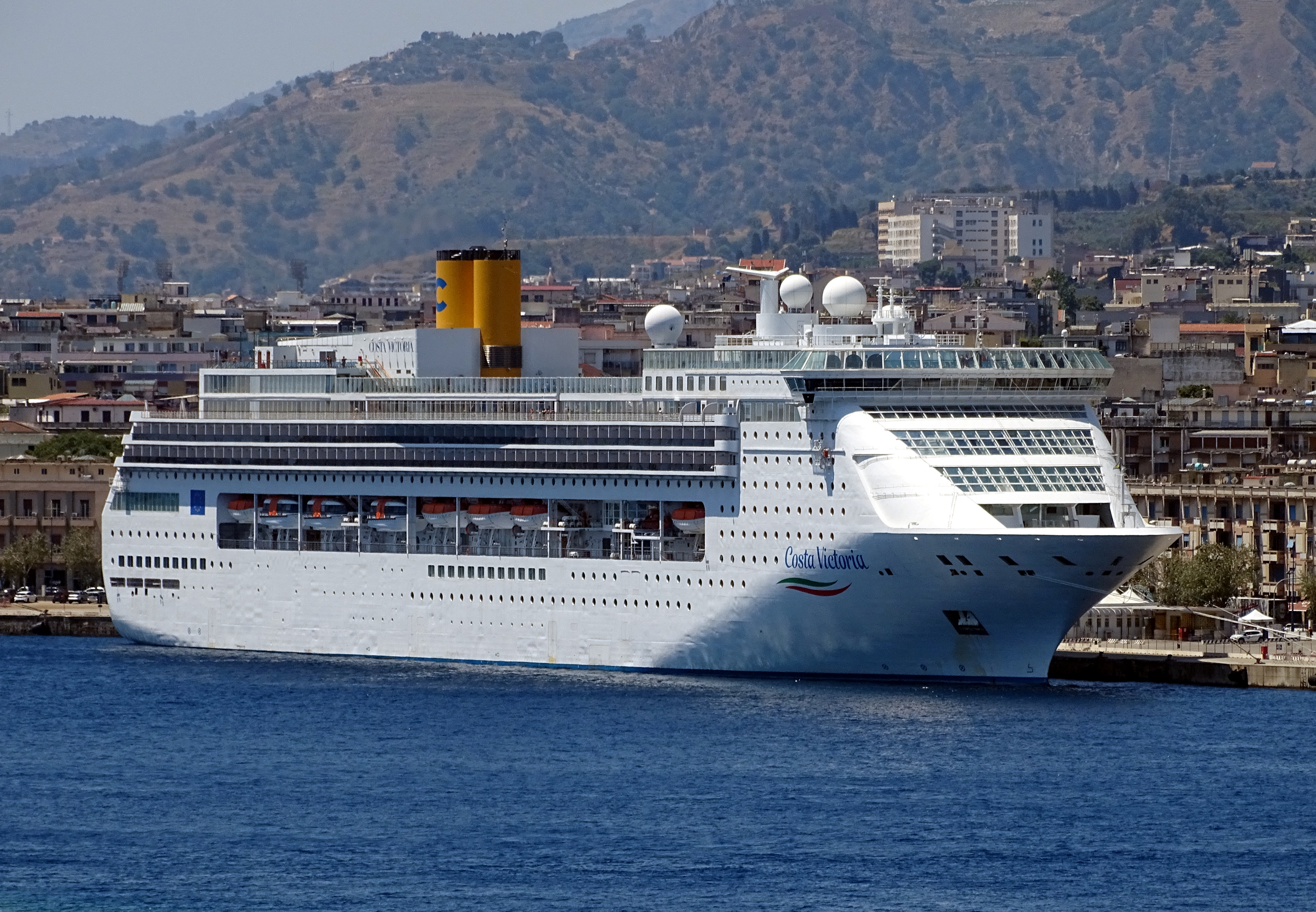
Costa Victoria in Messina, Italy in 2019.

During the COVID-19 pandemic, after the ship left Dubai on 7 March 2020, a female Argentine national tested positive after she had disembarked in Crete. 726 passengers on the ship were quarantined. The ship did not dock at Venice, her final destination, or nearby Trieste, and passengers ultimately departed the ship after she docked in Civitavecchia on 25 March. On 4 May 2020, a 69-year-old woman linked to the ship died from the coronavirus, while her husband was also infected.

=== Deployments ===
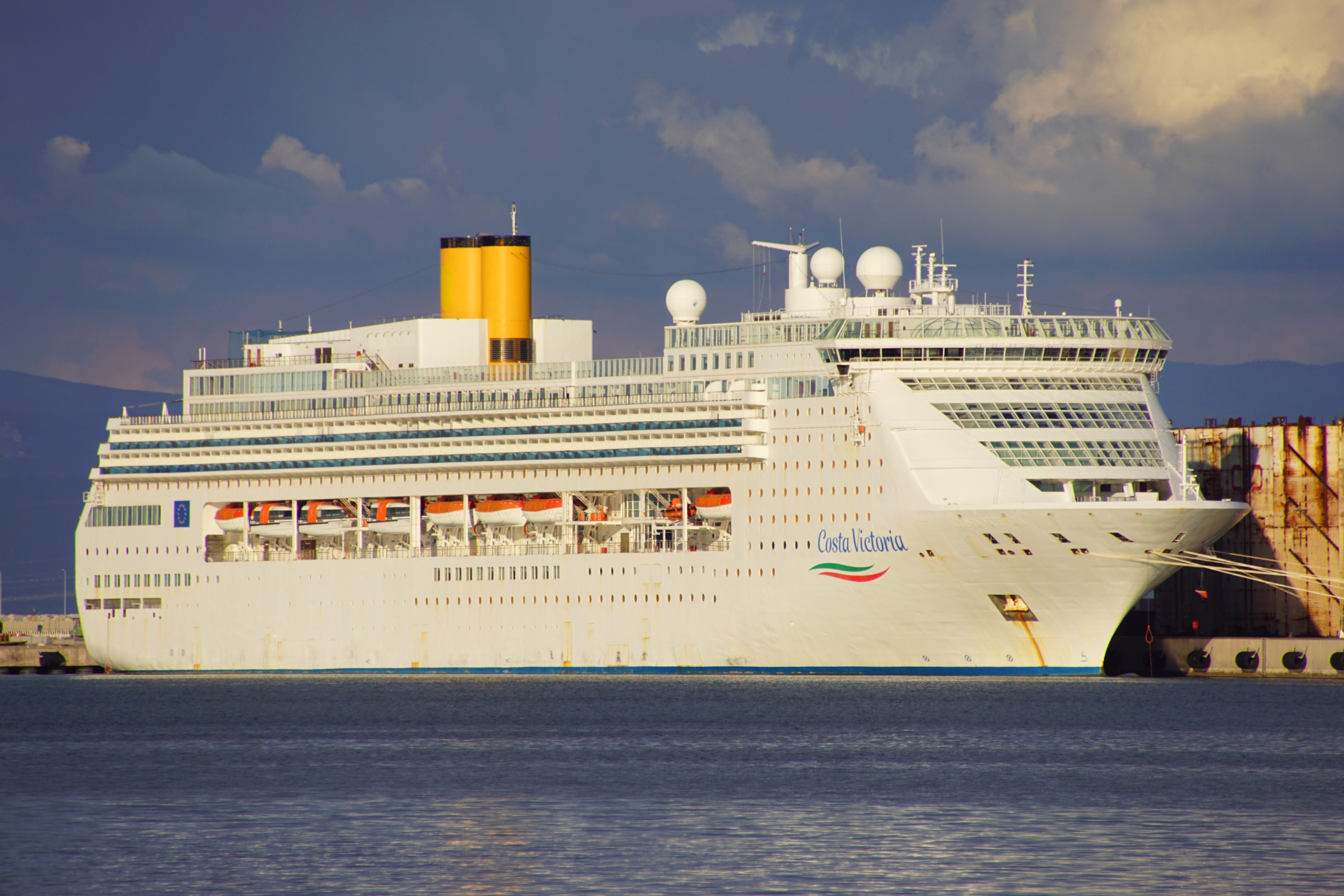
Costa Victoria laid up in Piombino, Italy in 2020.

In April 2018, the ship sailed in Asia, including China, and in summer 2018, the Mediterranean. In November 2019, the ship sailed cruises from Mumbai to the Maldives and fortnightly cruises to Sri Lanka. Costa Victoria was set to sail from Aqaba from October 2019 to 2020, but due to the COVID-19 pandemic, Costa's operations were suspended and her planned sailings were cancelled prior to her ultimate departure from the fleet.

== Sale and scrapping ==
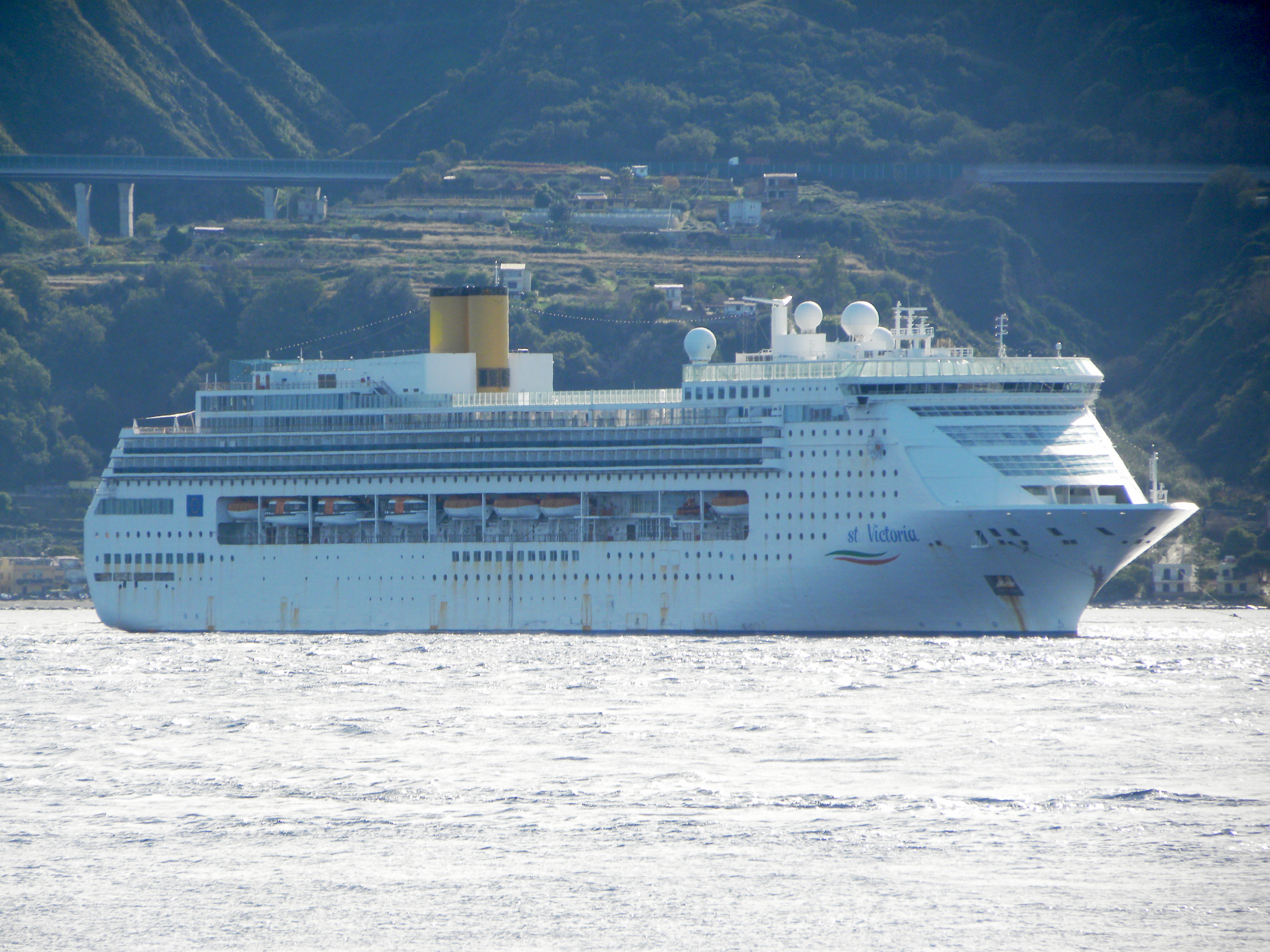
St. Victoria being towed towards the scrap yards.

She docked in Civitavecchia to disembark her final passengers on 25 March 2020. On 19 June, Costa sold Costa Victoria to Cantiere Navale San Giorgio del Porto SpA for possible conversion to an accommodation vessel for their shipyard workers in Genoa or, otherwise, for scrapping. On 23 June she was transferred to subsidiary Genova Trasporti Marittimi and berthed in Piombino.

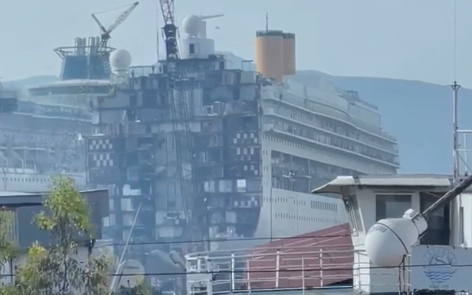
St. Victoria being scrapped in Aliaga, Turkey in May 2021.

On 13 January 2021, renamed St. Victoria, the ship left Piombino in towed of the tug VOS Chablis, to Aliağa, Turkey, for demolition and was beached on 28 January. Scrapping began in March.
