= SM U-74 =

History

German Empire
- Name: U-74
- Ordered: 6 January 1915
- Builder: Kaiserliche Werft Danzig
- Yard number: 30
- Launched: 10 August 1915
- Commissioned: 24 November 1915
- Fate: 17 May 1916 - Sank in a mine handling accident 3.5 nmi (6.5 km; 4.0 mi) off Dunbar, Scotland. 34 dead (all hands lost).

General characteristics
- Class & type: Type UE I submarine
- Displacement: 745 t (733 long tons) surfaced; 829 t (816 long tons) submerged
- Length: 56.80 m (186 ft 4 in) (o/a); 46.66 m (153 ft 1 in) (pressure hull)
- Beam: 5.90 m (19 ft 4 in) (o/a); 5.00 m (16 ft 5 in) (pressure hull)
- Height: 8.25 m (27 ft 1 in)
- Draught: 4.84 m (15 ft 11 in)
- Installed power: 2 × 800 PS (588 kW; 789 shp) surfaced; 2 × 800 PS (588 kW; 789 shp) submerged
- Propulsion: 2 shafts, 2× 1.41 m (4 ft 8 in) propellers
- Speed: 10.6 knots (19.6 km/h; 12.2 mph) surfaced; 7.9 knots (14.6 km/h; 9.1 mph) submerged
- Range: 5,480 nmi (10,150 km; 6,310 mi) at 7 knots (13 km/h; 8.1 mph) surfaced; 83 nmi (154 km; 96 mi) at 4 knots (7.4 km/h; 4.6 mph) submerged
- Test depth: 50 m (164 ft 1 in)
- Complement: 4 officers, 28 enlisted
- Armament: 2 × 50 cm (19.7 in) torpedo tubes (one starboard bow, one starbord stern); 4 torpedoes; 1 × 8.8 cm (3.5 in) SK L/30 deck guns

Service record
- Part of: I Flotilla; 18 March – 17 May 1916
- Commanders: Kptlt. Erwin Weisbach; 24 November 1915 – 17 May 1916
- Operations: 2 patrols
- Victories: 1 merchant ship sunk (2,802 GRT)

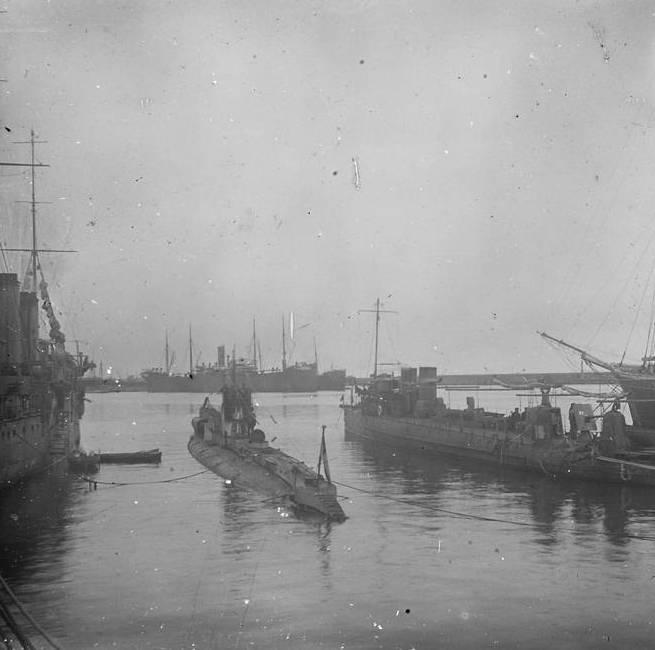
German submarine U-74 in the port of Barcelona (1918)

SM U-74 (Note: "SM" stands for "Seiner Majestät" (English: His Majesty's) and combined with the U for Unterseeboot would be translated as His Majesty's Submarine.) was a Type UE 1 submarine and one of the 329 submarines serving in the Imperial German Navy in World War I. U-74 was engaged in the naval warfare and took part in the First Battle of the Atlantic.

== Design ==
Type UE I submarines were preceded by the longer Type U 66 submarines. U-74 had a displacement of 755 tonnes (743 long tons) when at the surface and 829 tonnes (816 long tons) while submerged. She had a total length of 56.80 m (186 ft 4 in), a pressure hull length of 46.66 m (153 ft 1 in), a beam of 5.90 m (19 ft 4 in), a height of 8.25 m (27 ft 1 in), and a draught of 4.84 m (15 ft 11 in). The submarine was powered by two 800 metric horsepower (590 kW; 790 shp) engines for use while surfaced, and two 800 metric horsepower (590 kW; 790 shp) engines for use while submerged. She had two propeller shafts. She was capable of operating at depths of up to 50 metres (160 ft).

The submarine had a maximum surface speed of 10.6 knots (19.6 km/h; 12.2 mph) and a maximum submerged speed of 7.9 knots (14.6 km/h; 9.1 mph). When submerged, she could operate for 83 nautical miles (154 km; 96 mi) at 4 knots (7.4 km/h; 4.6 mph); when surfaced, she could travel 5,480 nautical miles (10,150 km; 6,310 mi) at 7 knots (13 km/h; 8.1 mph). U-74 was fitted with two 50 centimetres (20 in) torpedo tubes (one at the port bow and one starboard stern), four torpedoes, and one 8.8 cm (3.5 in) SK L/30 deck gun. She had a complement of thirty-two (twenty-eight crew members and four officers).

== Summary of raiding history ==
Date	Name	Nationality	Tonnage (Note: Tonnages are in gross register tons)	Fate
20 April 1916	Sabbia	United Kingdom	2,802	Sunk

== Bibliography ==
- Gröner, Erich; Jung, Dieter; Maass, Martin (1991). U-boats and Mine Warfare Vessels. German Warships 1815–1945. Vol. 2. Translated by Thomas, Keith; Magowan, Rachel. London: Conway Maritime Press. ISBN 0-85177-593-4.
