= Uppland Runic Inscription 77 =

Coordinates: 59.3786°N 17.9750°E

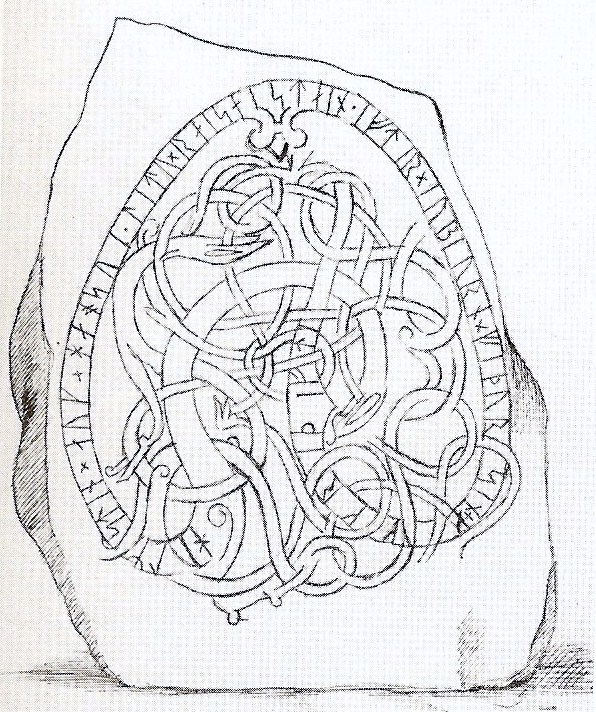
A drawing by Johan Peringskiöld from the 1700s.

Uppland Runic Inscription 77 is the Rundata catalog number for a Viking Age memorial runestone that is located at Råsta, which is in Sundbyberg Municipality, Stockholm County, Sweden, which is in the historic province of Uppland.

== Description ==
This runestone, which is 1.75 metres (5.7 ft) in height and made of granite, consists of runic text on a serpent that becomes intertwined with itself in the center of the design. The inscription is classified as being carved in runestone style Pr4, which is also known as Urnes style. This runestone style is characterized by slim and stylized animals that are interwoven into tight patterns. The animal heads are typically seen in profile with slender almond-shaped eyes and upwardly curled appendages on the noses and the necks. The inscription has been attributed based upon stylistic analysis to a runemaster named Torgöt Fotsarve.

The runic text is in the younger futhark and states that the stone was raised by two brothers named Holmsteinn and Hôsvi as a memorial to their father Jóbjôrn and to another man believed to be named Gyríðr.

== Inscription ==
hulmstin × auk × haosui × litu × raisa istain × iftir × iybiurn × faþur sin × auk × kiriþ × ifti
Holmsteinn {} ok {} Hǫsvi {} létu {} reisa stein {} eptir {} Jóbjǫrn, {} fǫður sinn, {} ok {} Gyríðr(?) {} eptir.
Holmstæinn {} ok {} Hosvi {} letu {} ræisa stæin {} æftiʀ {} Iobiorn, {} faður sinn, {} ok {} Gyrið(?) {} æftiʀ.
Holmsteinn and Hǫsvi had the stone raised in memory of Jóbjǫrn, their father; and Gyríðr(?) in memory of (him).

== See also ==
- List of runestones
