= Type UE I submarine =

German submarine class

Class overview
- Builders: AG Vulkan, Hamburg; Kaiserliche Werft Danzig
- Operators: Imperial German Navy
- Preceded by: Type U 66
- Succeeded by: Type U 81
- Completed: 10
- Lost: 7

General characteristics
- Displacement: 755 tonnes (743 long tons) surfaced; 832 tonnes (819 long tons) submerged
- Length: 56.8 m (186 ft 4 in) (o/a); 46.66 m (153 ft 1 in) (pressure hull)
- Beam: 5.9 m (19 ft 4 in) (o/a); 5 m (16 ft 5 in) (pressure hull)
- Height: 8.25 m (27 ft 1 in)
- Draught: 4.86 m (15 ft 11 in)
- Propulsion: 900 hp (670 kW) surfaced; 660 kW (890 hp) submerged
- Speed: 10.6 knots (19.6 km/h; 12.2 mph) surfaced; 7.9 knots (14.6 km/h; 9.1 mph) submerged
- Range: 7,880 nmi (14,590 km; 9,070 mi) at 7 kn surfaced; 83 nmi (154 km; 96 mi) at 4 kn submerged
- Complement: 32 men
- Armament: One 50 cm (20 in) torpedo tubes forward and one 50 cm torpedo tubes aft; plus one 8.8 cm (3.5 in) SK L/30 or 10.5 cm (4.1 in) SK L/45 deck gun; two minelaying tubes for 38 mines

The German Type UE I submarine was an ocean-going single-hull submarine with saddle tanks built by AG Vulkan in Hamburg and Kaiserliche Werft Danzig. The Type UE I was equipped with two six-cylinder Benz engines for 900 horsepower (670 kW) for a surface top speed of 9.6 knots (17.8 km/h; 11.0 mph) to 10.6 knots (19.6 km/h; 12.2 mph). Armed with a single torpedo tube forward and aft, plus one 8.8 cm (3.5 in) SK L/30 deck gun (U-72 received a 10.5 cm (4.1 in) SK L/45 gun in 1917), its main weapon were the 38 mines in two minelaying tubes. The boats were crewed by four officers and 28 men for a complement of 32.

List of Type UE I submarines
Boat	Fate
U-71	surrendered 1919, scrapped
U-72	scuttled 1 November 1918 at Cattaro
U-73	scuttled 30 October 1918 off Pula
U-74	sunk 27 May 1916 in the North Sea
U-75	sunk by mine 13 December 1917 in the North Sea
U-76	sunk 27 January 1917 in the Arctic Ocean
U-77	lost after 5 July 1916 in the North Sea
U-78	sunk 28 October 1918 in the North Sea
U-79	surrendered November 1918, became French submarine Victor Reveille, scrapped 1935
U-80	surrendered January 1919, scrapped
