= Lloyd Werft =

Shipyard in Bremerhaven, Bremen, Germany

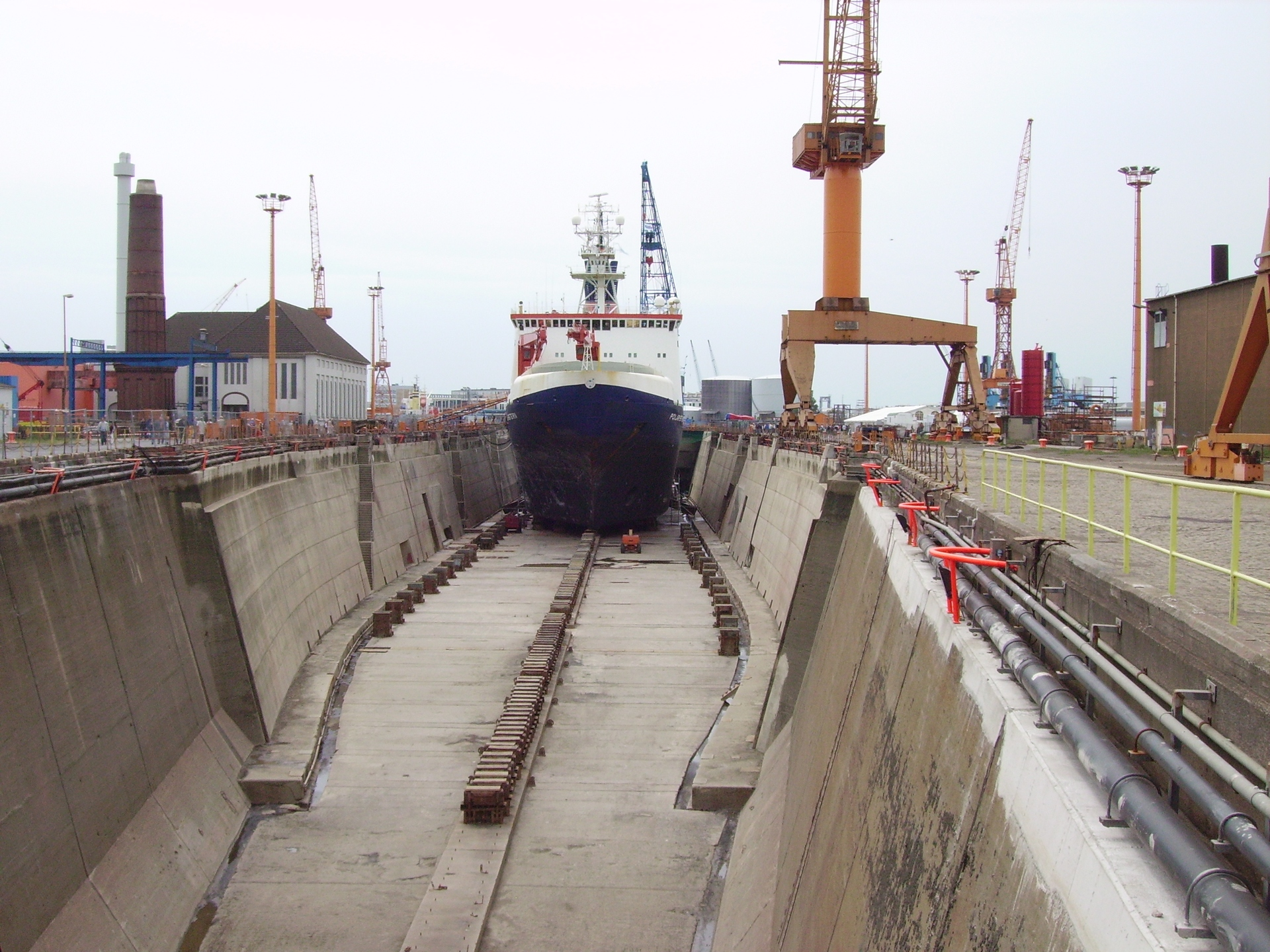
Drydock containing Polarstern

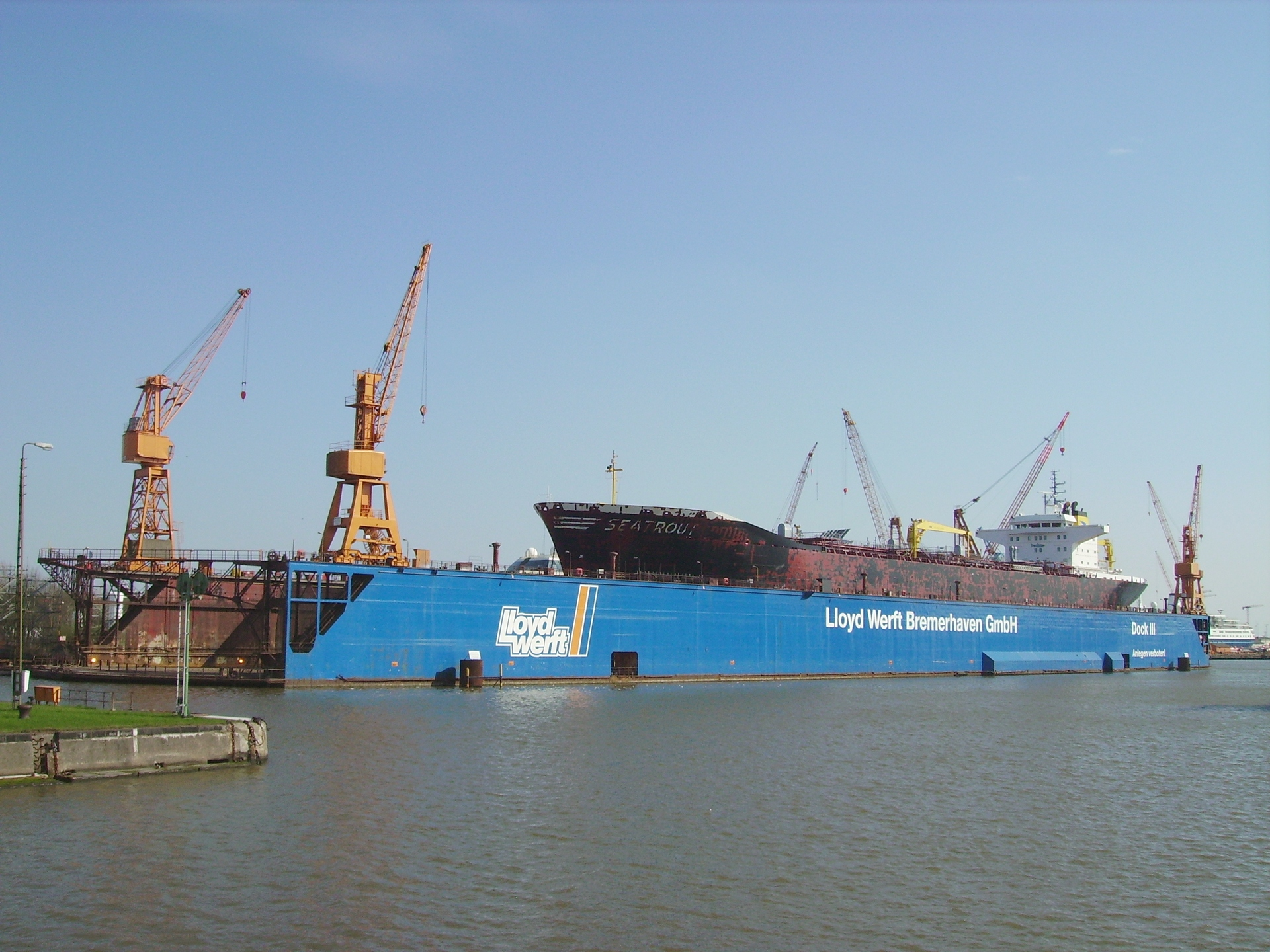
the floating dock Schwimmdock III

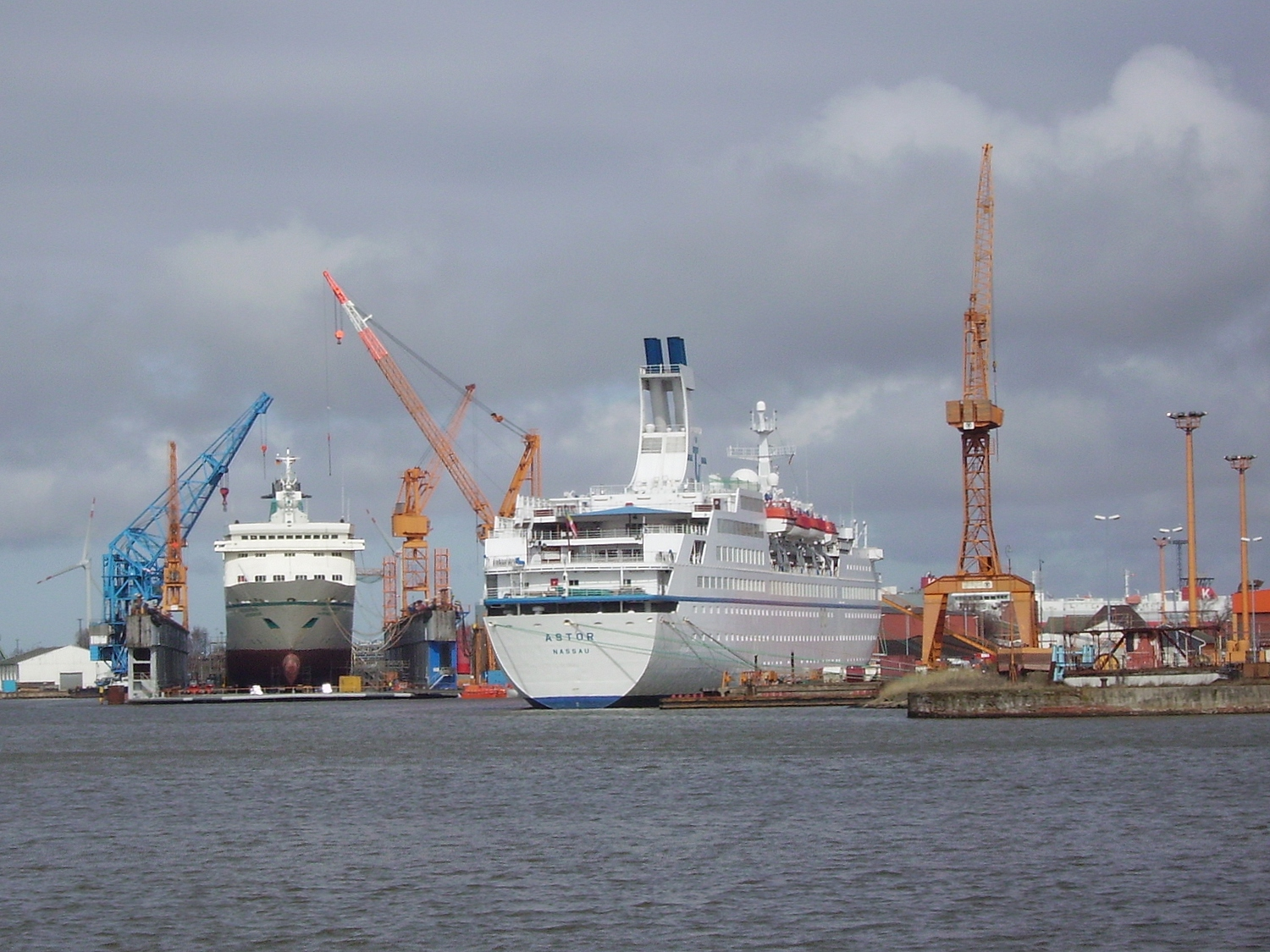
Alexander von Humboldt (left) and Astor in the floating dock

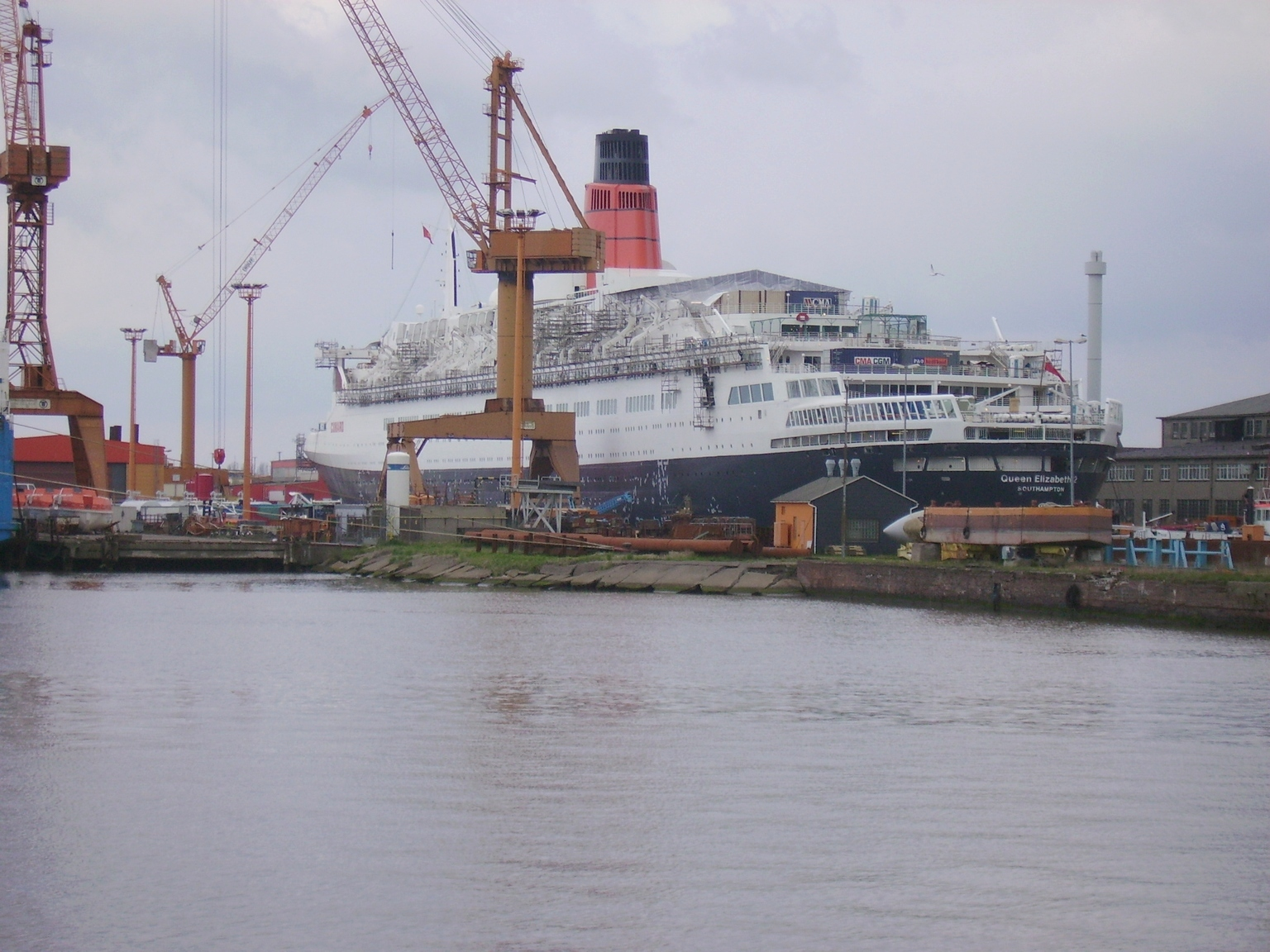
Queen Elizabeth 2 in 2006

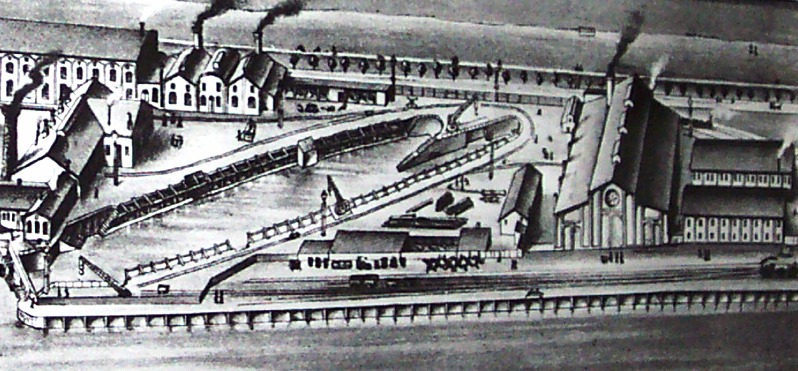
Early plan of Lloyd Werft buildings and dock

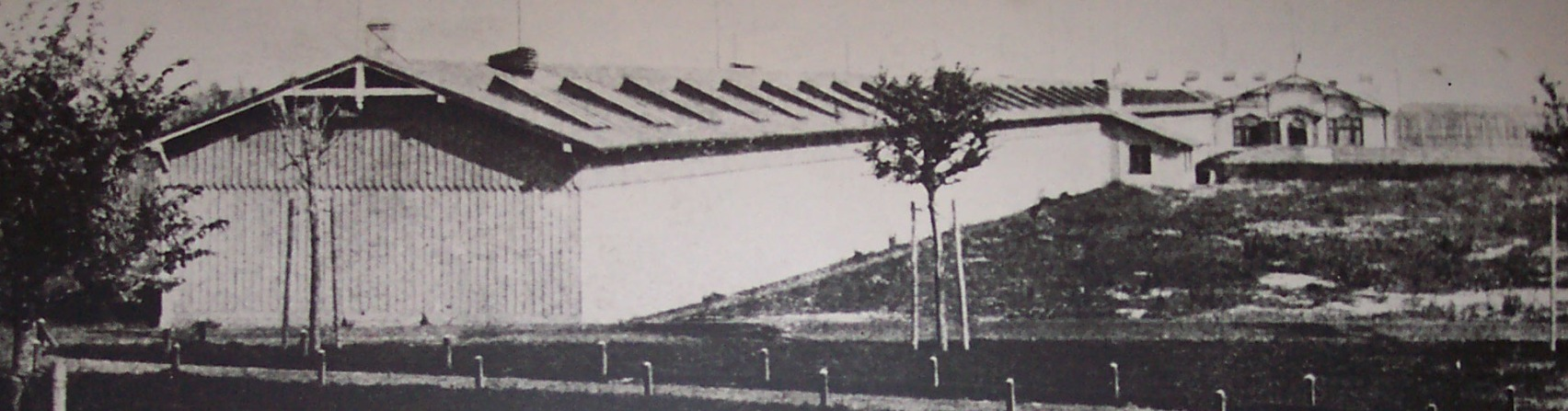
1899 view

Lloyd Werft Bremerhaven GmbH is a dockyard in Bremerhaven, Germany. It was founded in 1863 by the shipping company Norddeutscher Lloyd, first mainly used as a repair workshop for the company’s own merchant fleet. This new yard was established in exchange and addition to the former small Lloyd-workshop in Bremen which was already founded in 1857.

In the 1970s, the shipyard became member of the Vulkan Group.

As of 2016, the Lloyd facility is the last remaining major dockyard in Bremerhaven. It employs 500 workers and occupies 260,000 square metres (2,800,000 sq ft). Ships with a draught as deep as 11.5 metres (38 ft) can be accommodated. The dockyard is solely focused on ship repair, maintenance and reconstruction.

In 2015, Genting Hong Kong, a Hong Kong–based holding company whose brands had a total of 10 ships on order from Lloyd Werft at the time, purchased a majority stake in Lloyd Werft. In 2016, Genting purchased the remaining 30% of Lloyd Werft, as well as Nordic Yards' Wismar, Warnemunde, and Stralsund shipyards, and combined them to form the Lloyd Werft Group.

After filing for bankruptcy in January 2022 Lloyd Werft was sold in March 2022.
