= Bremer Vulkan =

German shipbuilding company

Coordinates: 53°10′31″N 8°35′54″E

Bremer Vulkan AG
- Industry: Shipbuilding
- Founded: 1893
- Defunct: 1997
- Fate: Bankrupt
- Headquarters: Bremen-Vegesack, Germany
- Number of employees: ~22,000 (total Vulkan Group 1996)
- Parent: Johann Lange Shipyard and Bremer Schiffbaugesellschaft, former H. F. Ulrichs Shipyard

Bremer Vulkan AG was a prominent German shipbuilding company located at the Weser river in Bremen-Vegesack. It was founded in 1893 and closed in 1997 because of financial problems and mismanagement.

All together Bremer Vulkan built about 1100 ships, including the ships of the predecessor Johann Lange Shipyard, of different types. It is remarkable that the Bremer Vulkan, with the exception of both World Wars, only built civilian ships; production of naval ships except during wartime first started in the 1980s.

== History ==
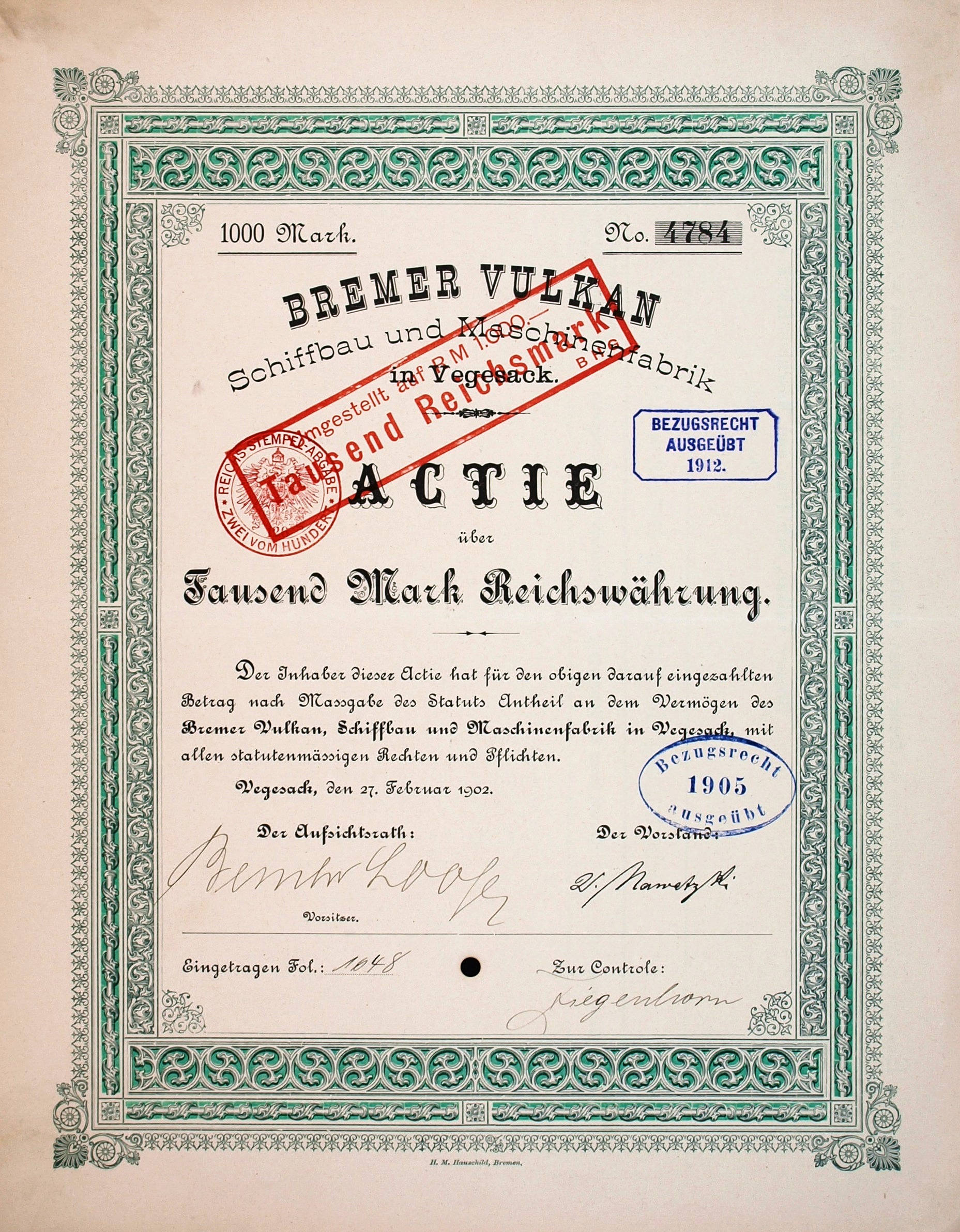
Share of the Bremer Vulkan, issued 27 February 1902

Bremer Vulkan AG was founded 1893 in Vegesack-a suburb of the city of Bremen–by a group of investors and Bremen merchants and by overtaking the 1805 founded Johann Lange Shipyard. Two years later the Bremer Vulkan bought the Bremer Schiffbaugesellschaft – former H. F. Ulrichs Shipyard which launched the first ship in 1839 - including all its modern shipbuilding facilities. The first director of the Bremer Vulkan became the engineer Victor Nawatzki (1855–1940).

In the following years the Bremer Vulkan increased rapidly. By 1908 it covered an area of about 80 acres (32 ha) and a water frontage of 1,500 metres (4,900 ft). Six slips equipped with modern electric travelling cranes were capable of building the largest vessels of that time. With an average annual delivery of about 40000 BRT it became the greatest civilian shipbuilding company in the German Empire, followed by Flensburger Schiffbaubetriebe in Flensburg, Joh. C. Tecklenborg in Bremerhaven and Vulcan Stettin in Stettin. The number of co-workers had increased from about 60 at the beginning up to about 3,300 in 1912.

During World War I the Bremer Vulkan built warships. All together 11 minesweepers (M 39–M 42 and M 54–M 56, M 71–M 74) and in cooperation with the Germaniawerft in Kiel some submarine hulls and 6 complete submarines (U-160–U-163) were built for the Kaiserliche Marine (Imperial German Navy).

After the war Bremer Vulkan continued its development. Different types of ships were built first mainly for German ship owners and with an increasing amount also for foreign ship owners later. An important progress was the change of ship propulsion from steam engines to diesel engines. In cooperation and under licence from MAN the Bremer Vulkan started the production of diesel ship-engines.

During World War II, 74 different Type VII U-boats were constructed for the Kriegsmarine. The Vulkan facility was several times target of the bombing of Bremen in World War II. The greatest bombing attack happened in March 1943 by the US Air Force. By the so-called "precise bombing" many buildings and U-boats under construction as well as surrounding private buildings were destroyed or damaged. 116 people were killed and additional 118 injured. Despite the great destruction, production of U-boats could be continued within a few weeks.

During the war about 10 kilometres (6.2 mi) downstream from the BV-shipyard between the Bremen suburbs Rekum and Farge the submarine bunker Valentin was under construction. Here under management of the BV and beginning end of 1945 monthly 15 U-boats should be assembled from prefabricated sections. Those were delivered from the following shipyards Bremer Vulkan AG, Deschimag AG Weser in Bremen, Deschimag Seebeck AG in Bremerhaven and Blohm + Voss in Hamburg. However, the bunker was not finished before the end of the war and no U-boats were ever built there. The building itself still exists today and is partly used as a memorial to the many forced labourers from nearby concentration camps who worked and died there during construction of the bunker.

Robert Kabelac – director of the BV from 1935 to 1960 – managed to avoid the dismantling of the BV after war as this happened to most other German shipyards. The company was allowed to resume shipbuilding already in 1949. Production could soon be continued, starting with repair of ships and locomotives and the construction of fishing vessels. Soon later the shipbuilding programme was enlarged and various types of ships were offered as container/multi purpose cargo ships, passenger liners, passenger-cargo vessels, roll-on/roll-off ships, LNG and LPG tankers, supply ships, special-purpose ships, reefer vessels and others. By the end of the 1970s the BV became a world leader in container delivered capacity and in innovative container ship design.

Beginning in the 1980s for the first time except wartimes of course also naval ships were built. As the general contractor the BV started in cooperation with other German shipbuilding companies the construction of frigates for the German Navy.

In the 1980s the BV merged with other German shipbuilding companies and became the largest shipbuilding company in Germany. The new Bremer Vulkan Verbund AG or the so-called Vulkan Group consisted of the following divisions at that time:

Division Shipbuilding, including the seven German shipyards Bremer Vulkan Werft (Bremen-Vegesack), Geeste Metallbau GmbH (Bremen), Flender Werft (Lübeck), Lloyd Werft, Rickmers Lloyd Dockbetrieb GmbH, Schichau Seebeckwerft (all in Bremerhaven) and Neue Jadewerft (Wilhelmshaven)

Division Naval Shipbuilding

Division Industry

Division Electronic and Systems Technology

Division Services

After the German reunification, in 1990 the Vulkan Group was enlarged by the Division Mecklenburg-Vorpommern, including the east German shipyards Matthias-Thesen Werft in Wismar and Volkswerft Stralsund in Stralsund.

At that time Vulkan Group included all together about 22,000 co-workers in Germany, of that about 18,000 in the shipbuilding divisions.

After 1996 bankruptcy because of financial problems and mismanagement, Bremer Vulkan closed the shipyard in Vegesack in 1997. Some of the affiliated shipyards as the Lloyd Shipyard in Bremerhaven and the shipyards in Eastern Germany survived this bankruptcy. The naval shipbuilding division was partly taken over by the Lürssen Shipbuilding Group.

== List of ships built ==
- 1816, First German steamship Die Weser, built by Johann Lange's shipyard
- 1872, First steel-hull ship built at Ulrich's shipyard
- 1893, Sailing Fishing Vessel BV2 Vegesack; still existing today in Vegesacker Hafen (Vegesack Museum Harbour)
- 1915, Passenger ship Zeppelin, later USS Zeppelin; greatest ship of the BV at that time
- 1925, Passenger ship Berlin; later Russian ship SS Admiral Nakhimov, sunk 1986
- 1928, the World's biggest tanker, MV C.O. Stillman
- 1938, Hohenfels; a DDG Hansa cargo ship, which became Empire Kamal
- 1939, HAPAG turbo-electric cargo ship Arauca; converted in 1941–42 into the US Navy auxiliary ship USS Saturn
- 1939, DDG Hansa cargo ship Goldenfels; in WWII converted into the auxiliary cruiser Atlantis; sunk by Royal Navy cruiser HMS Devonshire in 1941
- 1959, Rebuilding of the former French passenger ship SS Pasteur to the new TS Bremen
- 1964, German merchant fleet's first fully automated refrigerated cargo ship Nienburg
- 1981, Cruise liner MS Europa for shipping company Hapag-Lloyd; today MS Blue Sapphire
- 1982, First Bremen-class frigate F 207/Bremen for the German Navy; followed 1987 by F 213/Augsburg
- 1983, Cargo ship Pharos; worldwide greatest ship equipped with propulsion system “Grim Vane Wheel” (in German: Grimsches Leitrad)
- 1996, Luxury passenger cruiser Costa Victoria in collaboration with Lloyd Werft in Bremerhaven
- 1996, Hull of a luxury passenger cruiser, intended name Costa Olympia, after BV's bankruptcy the ship was 1999 finished as Norwegian Sky by Lloyd Werft in Bremerhaven
- 1997, 2,700 TEU container ships Hansa Century and Hansa Constitution (which ran aground in Hong Kong in 2014) were the last ships built by Bremer Vulkan
