= Norwegian Spirit =

Cruise ship

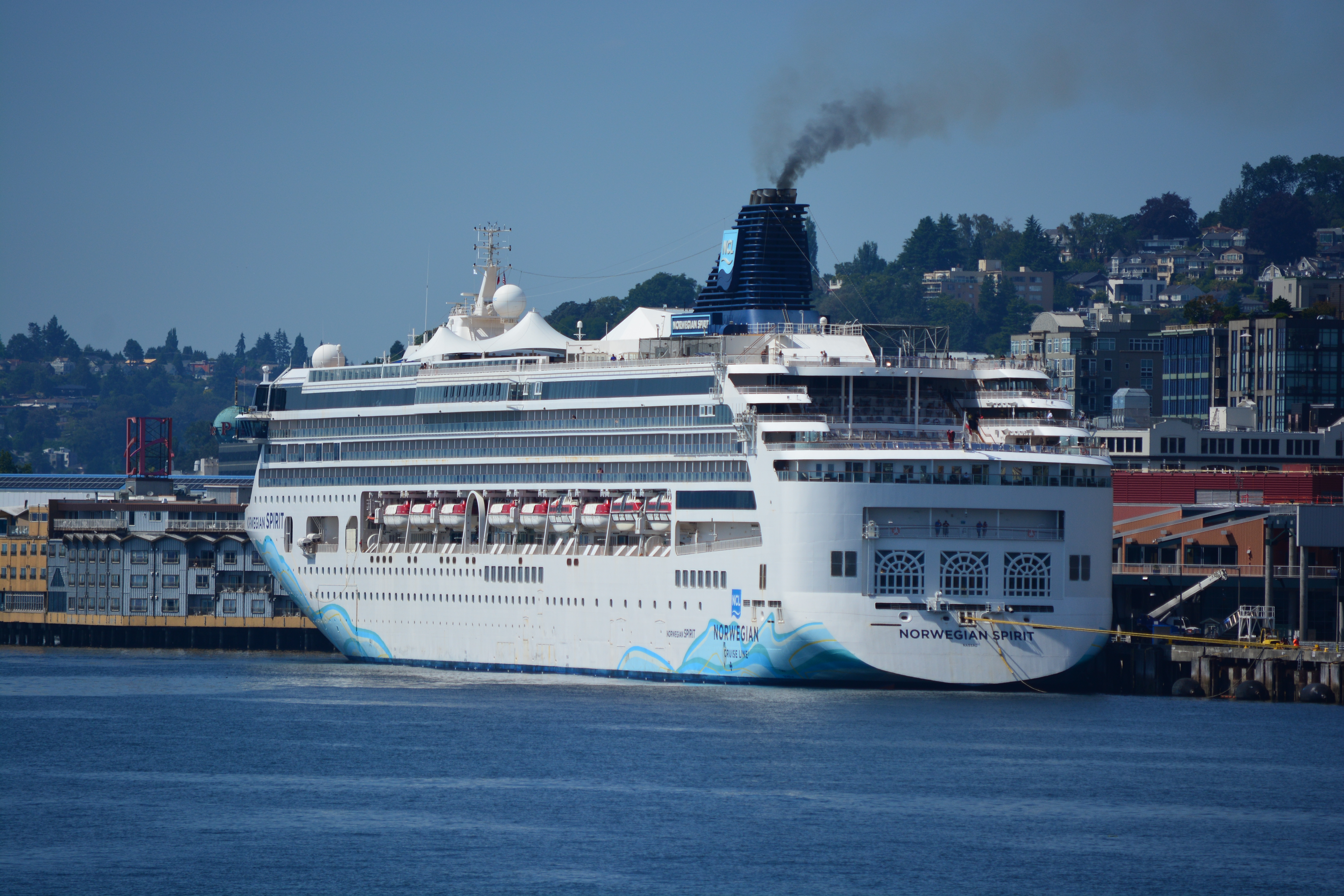
- Norwegian Spirit in Seattle

History
- Name: 1998–2004: SuperStar Leo; 2004–present: Norwegian Spirit
- Owner: 1998–2004: Star Cruises; 2004–present: Norwegian Cruise Line
- Port of registry: 1998–2004: Panama City, Panama; 2004 onwards: Nassau, Bahamas
- Builder: Meyer Werft, Papenburg, Germany
- Laid down: 5 October 1996
- Launched: 11 July 1998
- Completed: 25 September 1998
- Acquired: 2004
- In service: 1998
- Identification: Call sign: C6TQ6; IMO number: 9141065; MMSI number: 311746000
- Status: In Service

General characteristics
- Class & type: Leo-class cruise ship
- Tonnage: 75,904 GT
- Length: 879 ft (267.92 m)
- Beam: 105 ft (32.00 m)
- Height: 163 ft (49.68 m)
- Draft: 26 ft (7.92 m)
- Decks: 14
- Installed power: 4 × MAN B&W 14V48/60 (4 × 14,700 kW)
- Propulsion: Diesel-electric; two shafts; Two ABB HSSOL 38/1256 propulsion motors (2 × 20 MW)
- Speed: 21 knots (39 km/h; 24 mph); 24 knots (44 km/h; 28 mph) (maximum)
- Capacity: 2,018 passengers
- Crew: 912

Norwegian Spirit is a Leo-class cruise ship operated by Norwegian Cruise Line (NCL). She was built in 1998 for Star Cruises as SuperStar Leo by the Meyer Werft shipyard in Papenburg, Germany. In 2004 she was transferred to NCL and renamed Norwegian Spirit.

== History ==
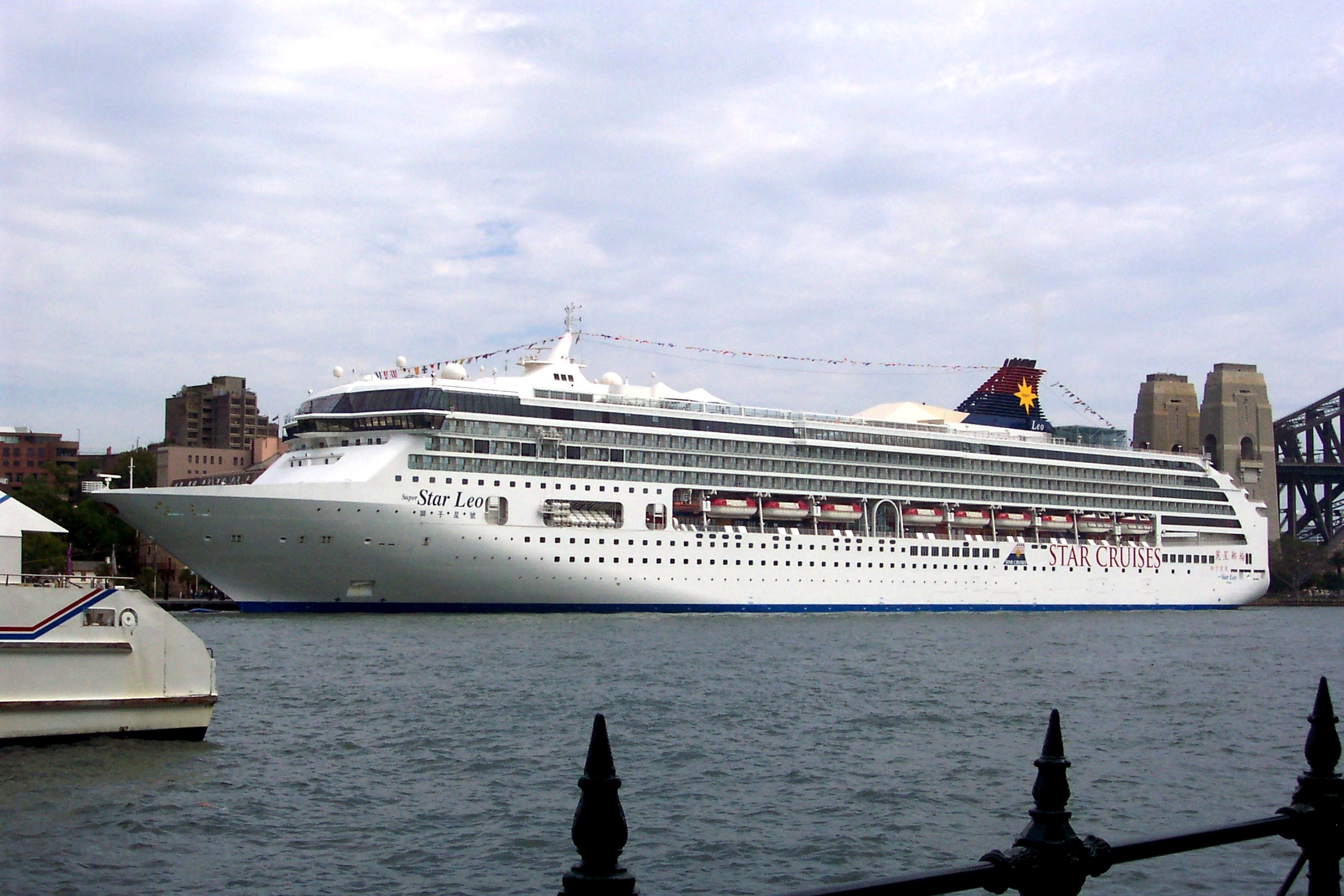
The vessel as SuperStar Leo in Sydney Harbour in 2004

The vessel was constructed by Meyer Werft in Papenburg, Germany. Named SuperStar Leo in 1998, the vessel was the first of Star Cruises' Leo class. After the test drives, which were successfully completed at the beginning of September 1998, the ship was delivered on 25 September 1998, one week earlier then contracted. She was then homeported in Singapore in 1998 and operated 2–5 night cruises to Malaysia and Thailand. One year later, SuperStar Virgo arrived in Singapore. She was then based in Hong Kong on 10 September 1999 and offered 1–5 night cruises to China, Hainan, Vietnam and the South China Sea.

In 2003, SuperStar Leo was transferred to Australia due to SARS in Asia and she returned to Hong Kong afterwards.

In 2004, Norwegian Cruise Line (NCL) was planning to launch Pride of America. However, just prior to completion, the vessel partially sank when a storm hit the Lloyd Werft shipyards. To meet the already booked cruises for Pride of America, Norwegian Sky was immediately rushed into service as Pride of Aloha. To compensate for the unexpected events, SuperStar Leo was immediately transferred to the NCL fleet, her planned cruises cancelled (thus forcing Star Cruises to refund or re-book passengers), and after only two weeks of refits, the vessel emerged as Norwegian Spirit, ready to assume the planned cruises of Norwegian Sky.

In January 2020 Norwegian Spirit underwent a major renovation project in Marseille, France. The ship received six new restaurants, seven new bars and lounges, enhanced public areas, new and modernized staterooms and new hull art. The drydock took 43 days and cost over $100 million.

In autumn 2024, the ship wrapped up a charter contract that saw it sailing from Taiwan over the summer.

== Vessel class ==
Norwegian Spirit is a Leo-class cruise ship and was the first ship of this design. She was followed by her sister ship Star Navigator (formerly SuperStar Virgo) which is currently operated by StarCruises No other ships of this particular design were constructed.

== Propulsion ==
Four 14-cylinder MAN B&W 14V48 medium speed diesel engines, each producing 14,700 kilowatts (19,700 hp), driving ABB electric propulsion motors coupled to twin propellers.

== Cruises ==
Norwegian Spirit was originally intended to operate cruises in Asia in 2020 following her refurbishment. However, this program was cancelled in February 2020 due to COVID-19 concerns and the ship was instead to operate cruises to the Greek Isles for the summer 2020 season. However, this program was also cancelled due to NCL suspending all sailings in response to the COVID-19 pandemic. She resumed operations in May 2022 with cruises in the South Pacific and Hawaii.

== Incidents ==
In 2005, Norwegian Spirit hit a pier in Juneau, Alaska, causing minor damage. In 2007, Norwegian Spirit again struck a pier, this time in New York Harbor. In both cases, repairs were made to the ship. On 25 May 2008, at approximately 9:00 am, Norwegian Spirit contacted Pier 90 in New York City at the end of an eight-day cruise to the Eastern Caribbean. She damaged the parking garage support columns and the bow of the ship.

In January 2006, the ship encountered heavy seas and rogue waves off the coast of Tortola resulting in the ship listing, broken windows and 11 flooded passenger cabins.

In March 2008 a passenger from Norwegian Spirit died following a zip-lining accident on an NCL-sponsored shore excursion in Roatán, Honduras.

In November 2009 a passenger from Norwegian Spirit died after being shot in a robbery during a port call in Santo Tomás de Castilla, Guatemala.

In June 2011 a passenger jumped overboard from Norwegian Spirit in the Mississippi River 3 hours after the ship had set sail from New Orleans, Louisiana. A rescue boat was deployed from the ship and the man was recovered alive.

In April 2018 a passenger went missing after reportedly going overboard whilst the ship was sailing off the coast of Cabo de Palos, Spain. A search operation was launched by the Spanish Coastguard, however the man was never found.

In October 2019, passengers held protests on a two-week cruise of Europe after planned stops were cancelled, toilets became blocked, and the cruise line offered as compensation a 25 percent discount off future cruises.

In March 2020, passengers of Norwegian Spirit were banned from disembarking in Port Victoria, Seychelles, amid fears over the coronavirus and the announcement of a temporary closing for cruise ships.

== Media ==
In 2003, Japanese TV drama Netsuretsu teki chuuka hanten took place on SuperStar Leo.

In 2012, Norwegian Spirit was briefly featured in a scene in 21 Jump Street whilst docked in New Orleans.
