= Kai Tak Cruise Terminal =

Maritime passenger terminal in Hong Kong

- 啟德郵輪碼頭
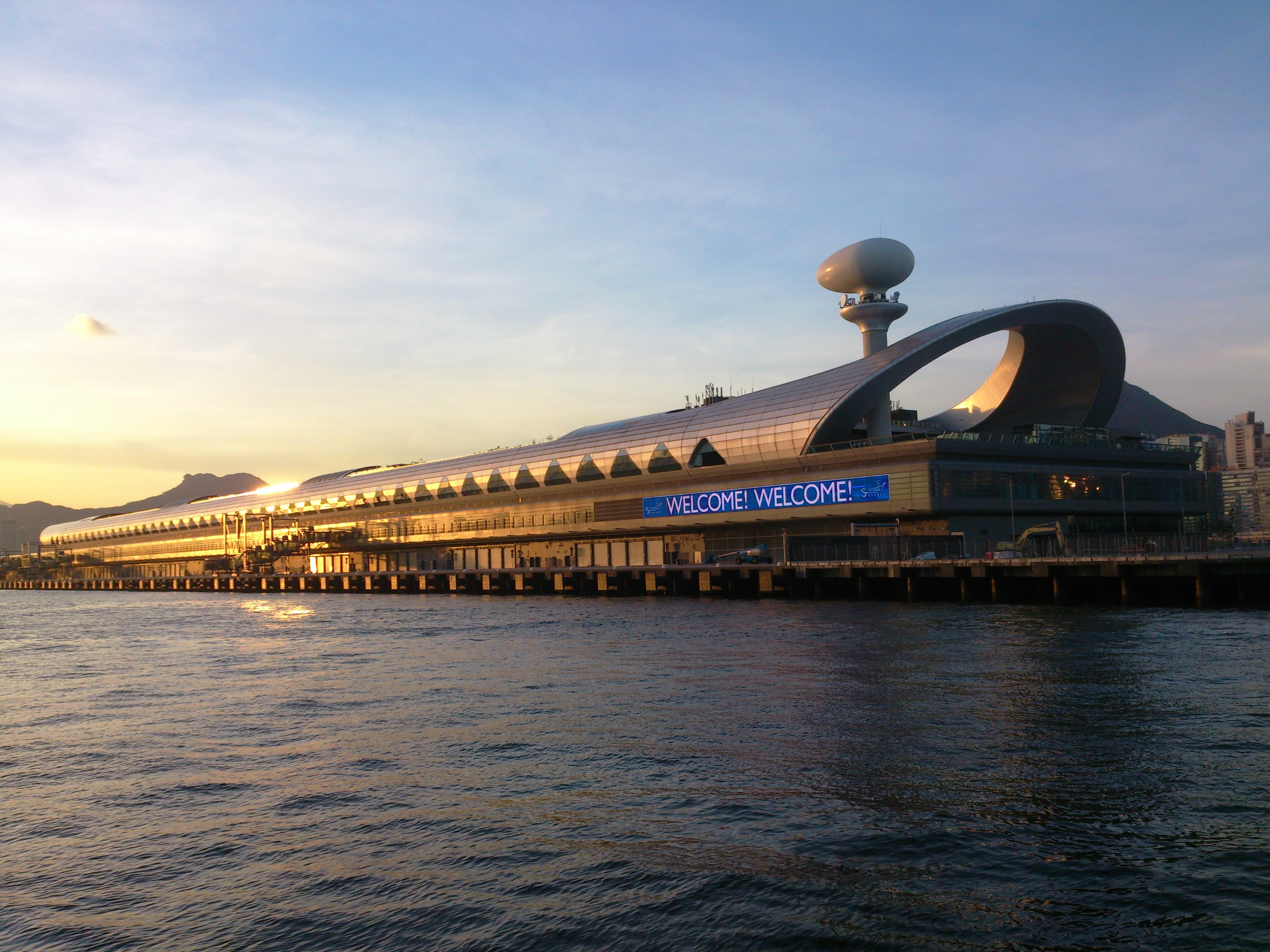

- Location within Hong Kong

General information
- Status: Operating
- Location: 33 Shing Fung Road, Kai Tak, Kowloon, Hong Kong
- Coordinates: 22.3074°N 114.2128°E
- Completed: approx. August 2014
- Opened: 12 June 2013; 13 years ago
- Cost: $7.2 billion Hong Kong dollars
- Owner: Government of Hong Kong

Technical details
- Floor count: 4
- Floor area: 184,000 m^{2} (1,980,000 sq ft), (with about 5,600 m^{2} (60,000 sq ft) of commercial area)

Design and construction
- Architects: Foster + Partners (architect of record Wong Tung and Partners)
- Main contractor: Dragages Hong Kong Limited

Website
- kaitakcruiseterminal.com.hk

Kai Tak Cruise Terminal
- Traditional Chinese: 啟德郵輪碼頭
- Simplified Chinese: 启德邮轮码头
Transcriptions
Standard Mandarin
- Hanyu Pinyin: Qǐdé Yóulún Mǎtóu
Yue: Cantonese
- Jyutping: Kai^{2}dak^{1} jau^{4} leon^{4} maa^{5} tau^{4}

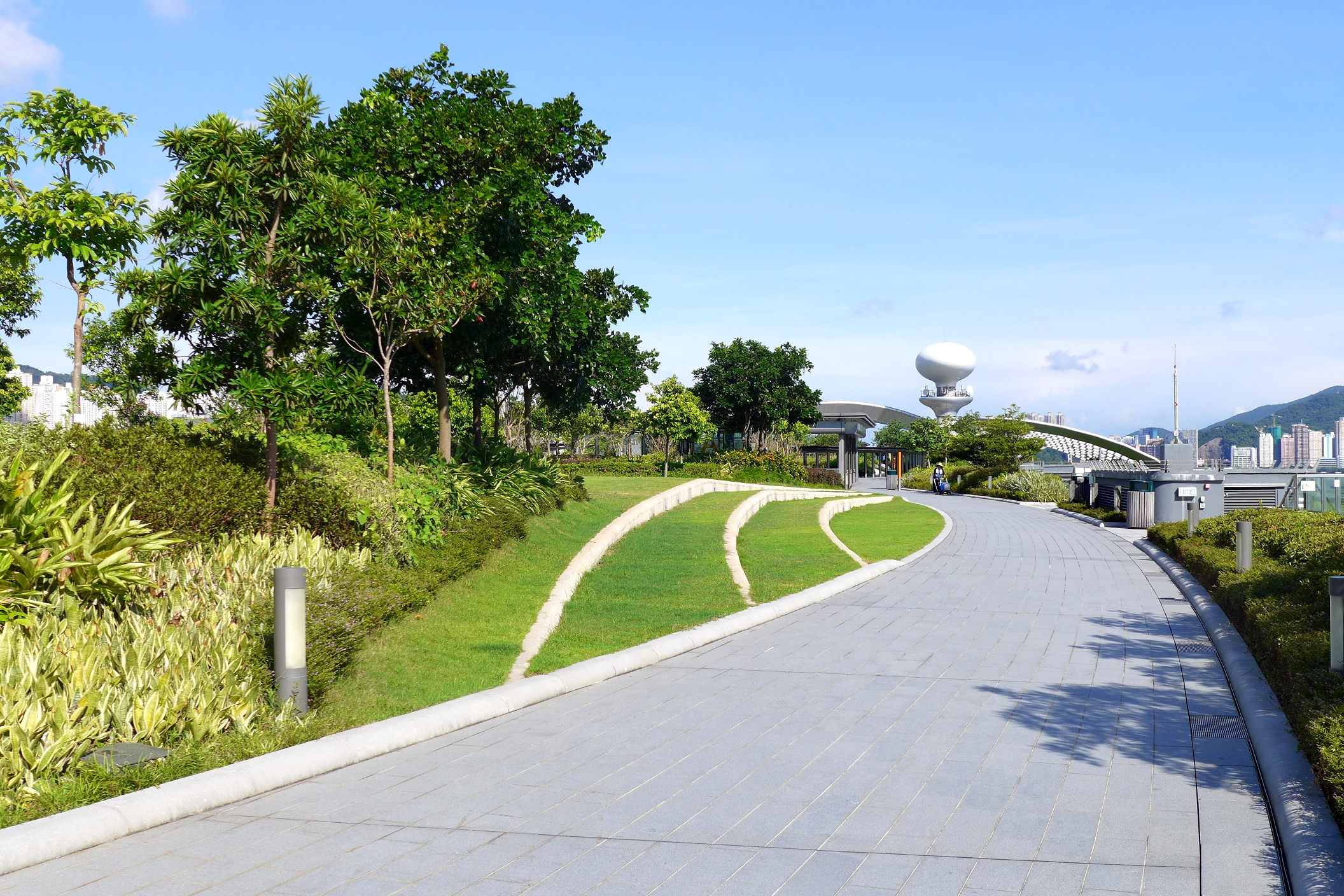
Kai Tak Cruise Terminal Park

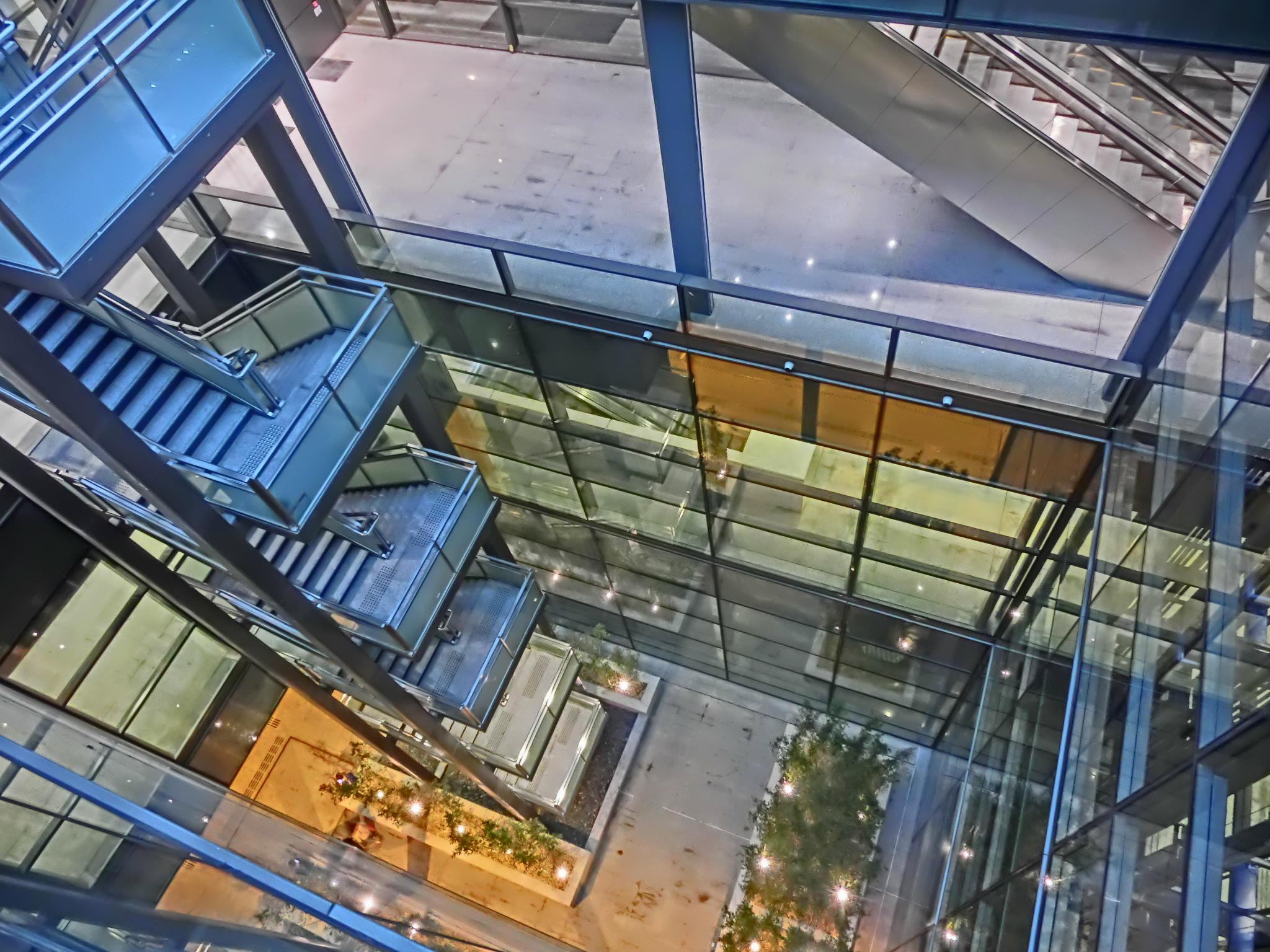
Courtyard inside terminal

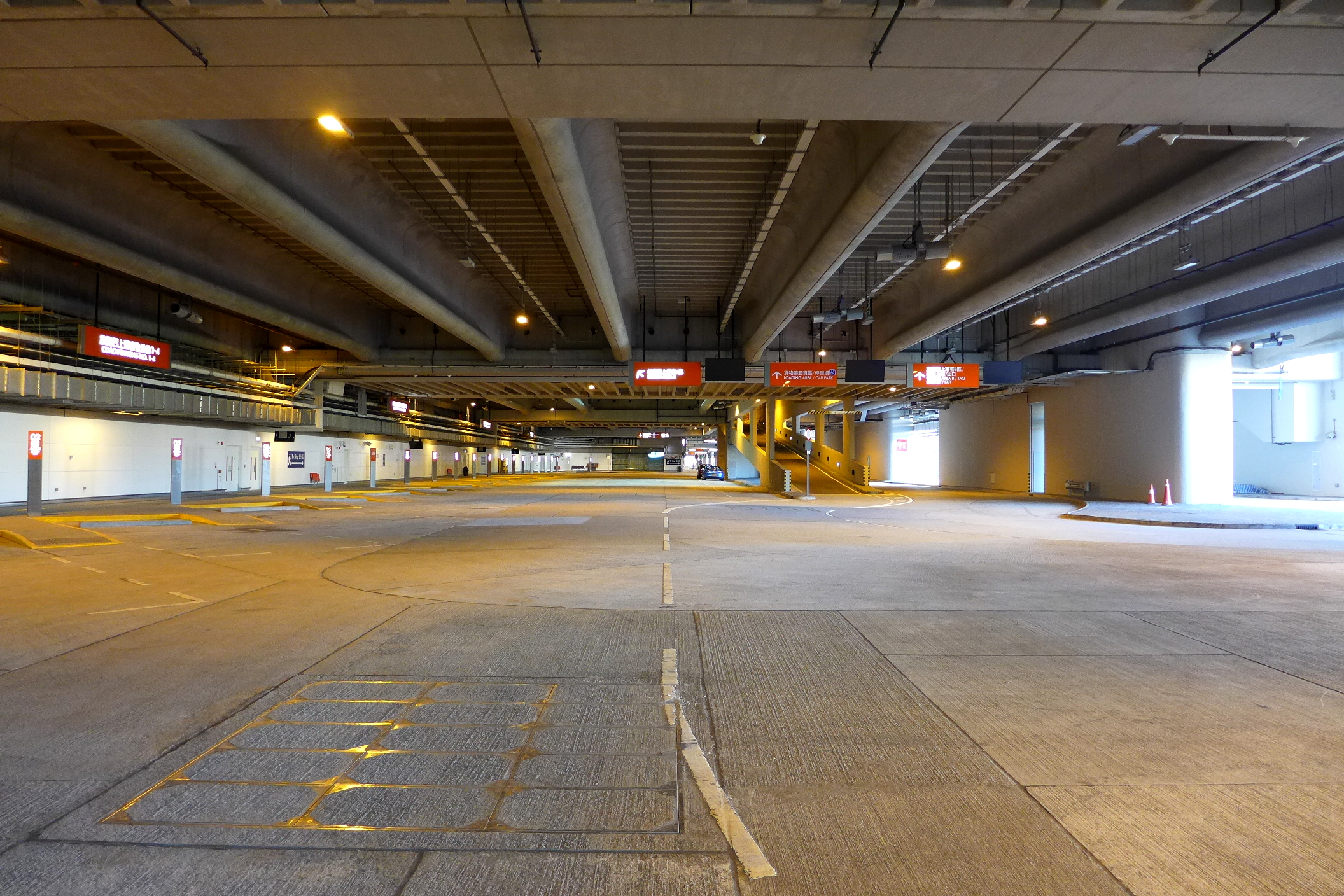
Coach Drop off area

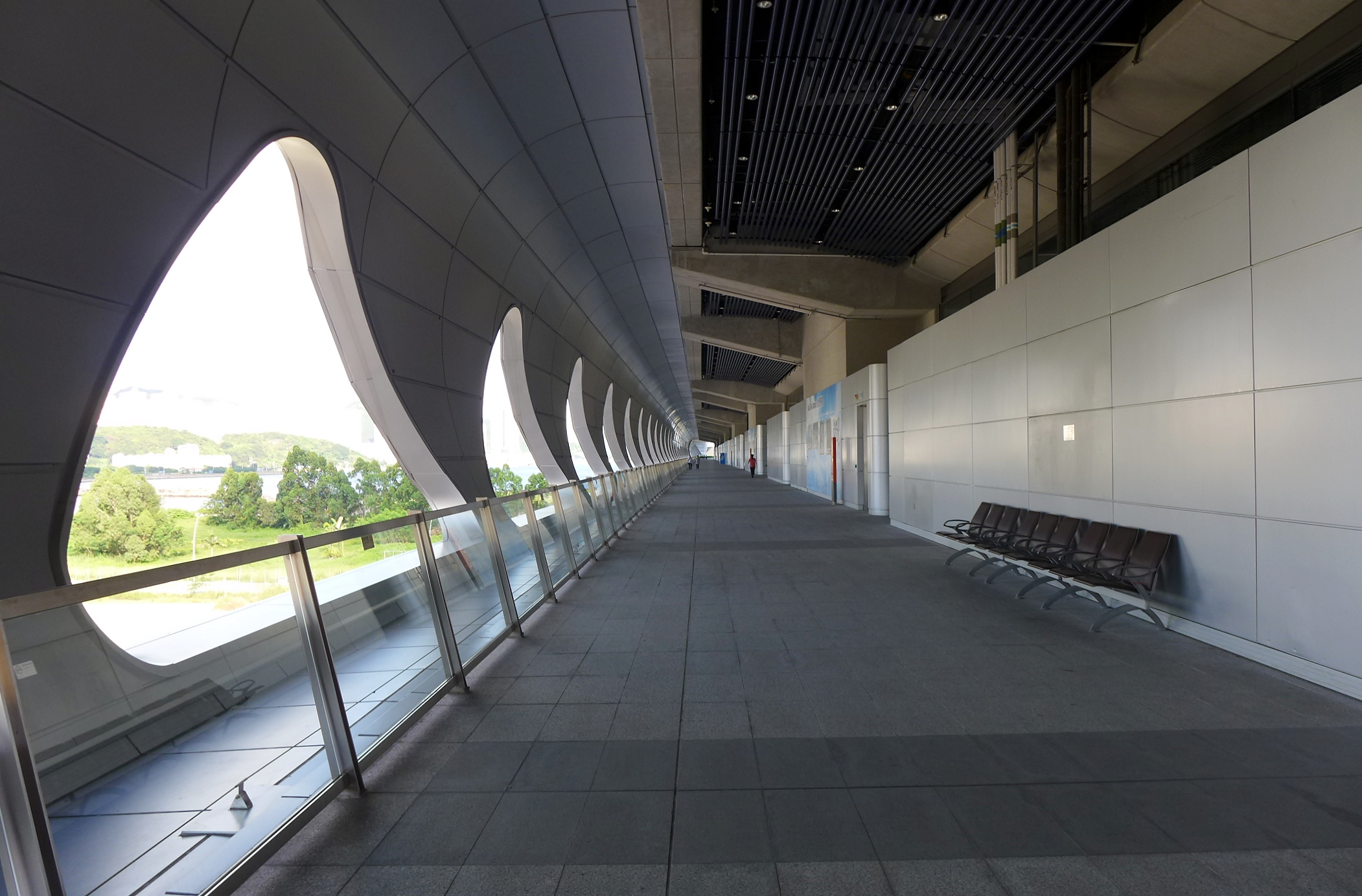
Outside access

Kai Tak Cruise Terminal is a cruise ship terminal on the former Kai Tak Airport runway in Hong Kong. Its completion date was delayed into 2013 due to re-tendering. Following an international competition, Foster + Partners was chosen to design the cruise terminal. The first ship berthed on 12 June 2013. The terminal has the capacity to berth two large 360-metre (1,180 ft) long vessels, which carry a total of 5,400 passengers and 1,200 crew, as well as anticipating the demands of cruise liners currently on the drawing board.

The Government announced that it would focus on the development of a new cruise terminal at Kai Tak development area to help Hong Kong become a regional transport hub for cruise ships. It was built by Dragages Hong Kong Limited and site formation was completed by Penta-Ocean Construction Company.

== History and development ==
The annual berth utilisation rate of Ocean Terminal in Tsim Sha Tsui, which offers two berths accommodating vessels of up to 50,000 tonnes (49,000 long tons), rose to 76% last year from 71% in 2003. Between 2001 and 2005, some 11 cruise vessels had to berth mid-stream and at container terminals because Ocean Terminal could not meet market demand.

Hong Kong's Secretary for Economic Development, Stephen Ip, said Hong Kong needs an additional berths between 2009 and 2015, and one to two more berths beyond 2015 to capture the growth of the regional cruise market.

- Berthing facilities – two alongside berths of 850 metres (2,790 ft), an apron area, fender system and passenger gangways;
- Support facilities – located mainly in the cruise terminal building, such as customs, immigration, quarantine counters, and 20 baggage handling areas; and,
- A commercial area inside the cruise terminal building with a maximum gross floor area of 5,600 square metres (60,000 ft^{2}) for retail facilities.

The Government at first adopted a market-driven approach in the new development. Selected through an open tender exercise, the successful bidder would have owned the 76,000 square metres (19 acres) of land for a 50-year period and form the site as well as design, build and operate the terminal.

A pre-tender consultation with relevant trades was conducted in the first half of next year to expedite the pace of development, followed by invitation of tenders in the fourth quarter. The tender was to be awarded in the second quarter of 2008. The estimated development cost, excluding that for the commercial area, was about $2.4 billion HKD.

== Tender ==
The Hong Kong Special Administrative Region Government issued an open tender on 9 November 2007 for the development of the new cruise terminal.

The new cruise terminal is designed with about 30,000 square metres (320,000 ft^{2}) for a baggage handling area, a passenger waiting/queuing area, a customs, immigration and health quarantine area and accommodation for other government departments; a maximum of 50,000 square metres (540,000 ft^{2}) in the cruise terminal building was set aside for such purposes as hotels, retail space, convention halls, offices, shops and eating places; and at least 22,000 square metres (240,000 ft^{2}) for a landscaped deck.

On 9 July 2008, the Secretary for Commerce & Economic Development Frederick Ma announced that the Kai Tak cruise development project will be re-tendered as submissions received in the previous exercise did not conform with requirements. Ma said two submissions were received in the previous tendering exercise which closed in March. One submission called for hotel rooms to be individually sold off, while the other asked to develop more commercial area.

Subject to lawmakers' approval, the Government will re-tender the site by year's end, aiming to award the tender by the third quarter of 2009. The first berth of the new cruise terminal was expected to begin operation by the second quarter of 2013.

In December 2025, the government launched an open tender for the operation and management of the Kai Tak Cruise Terminal, as the contract with the incumbent operator is due to expire on 31 May 2028. The new tenancy is scheduled to commence on 1 June 2028 for an initial term of ten years, with a possible five-year extension subject to performance review.

Under the tender arrangements, the successful bidder will manage the entire terminal site, including cruise operations and public areas such as the rooftop park and podium gardens.

== Construction ==
The Government wanted to seek lawmakers' approval to fund the site formation works and facilities required for the provision of government services in the fourth quarter of 2008. At that time, the estimated cost ranges from $1.8 billion to $2 billion.

The Civil Engineering & Development Department awarded a $407 million contract for stage-one infrastructure works at the former Kai Tak Airport on 2 September 2009. Works started on 4 September for completion in four years. The contract comprises the construction of a 1.8 km (1.1 mi)-long two-lane road, associated drainage, sewerage and water works, and a fireboat berth and public landing steps. The works will provide infrastructure to serve the early development of the southern part of the former runway area, which includes the first cruise terminal berth and a park. The works have been designed by AECOM Asia which will also supervise construction.

Permanent Secretary for Development (Works), Mak Chai-kwong, and the Managing Director of Dragages Hong Kong Limited, Nicolas Borit, signed a design and build contract for the Kai Tak Cruise Terminal Building on 8 May 2010. The first berth was to be commissioned in mid-2013 and was to be capable of accommodating the world's largest cruise vessels. The second berth was to commence operation in 2014 for berthing medium-sized cruise vessels. The second berth will be ready from early 2016.

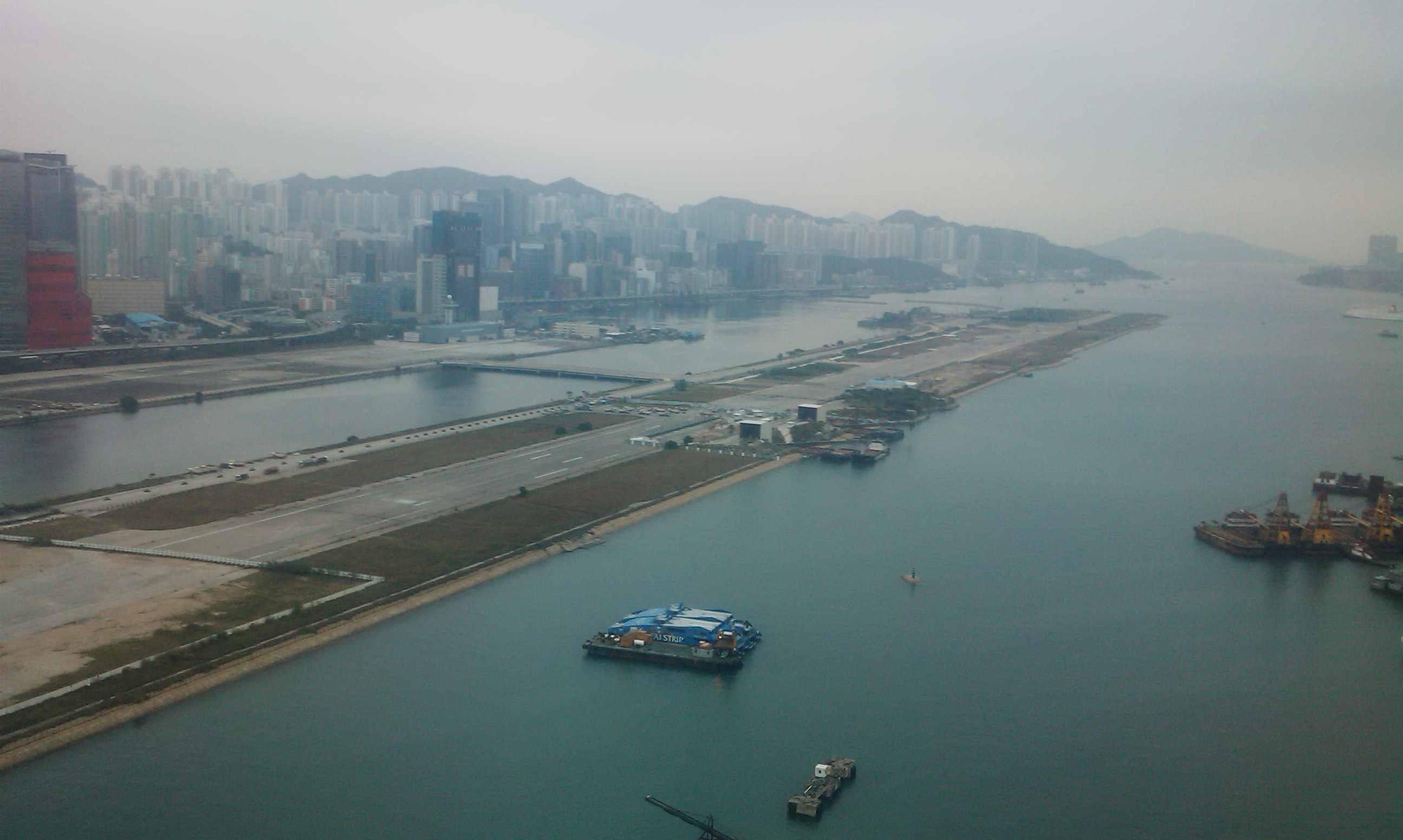
The Kai Tak Cruise Terminal site is located at the tip of the Ex-Kai Tak Airport runway 31.

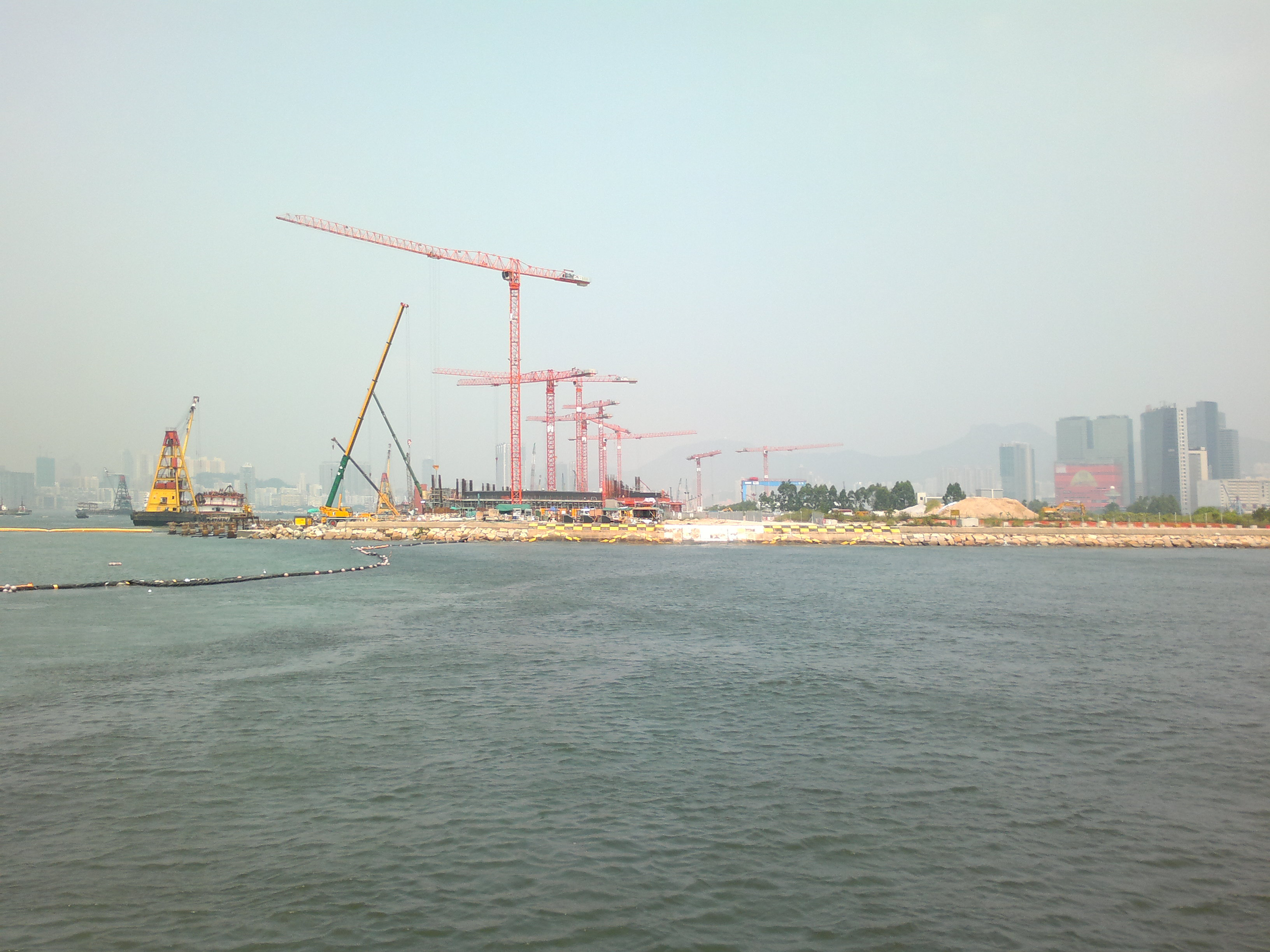
Kai Tak Cruise Terminal under construction in August 2011

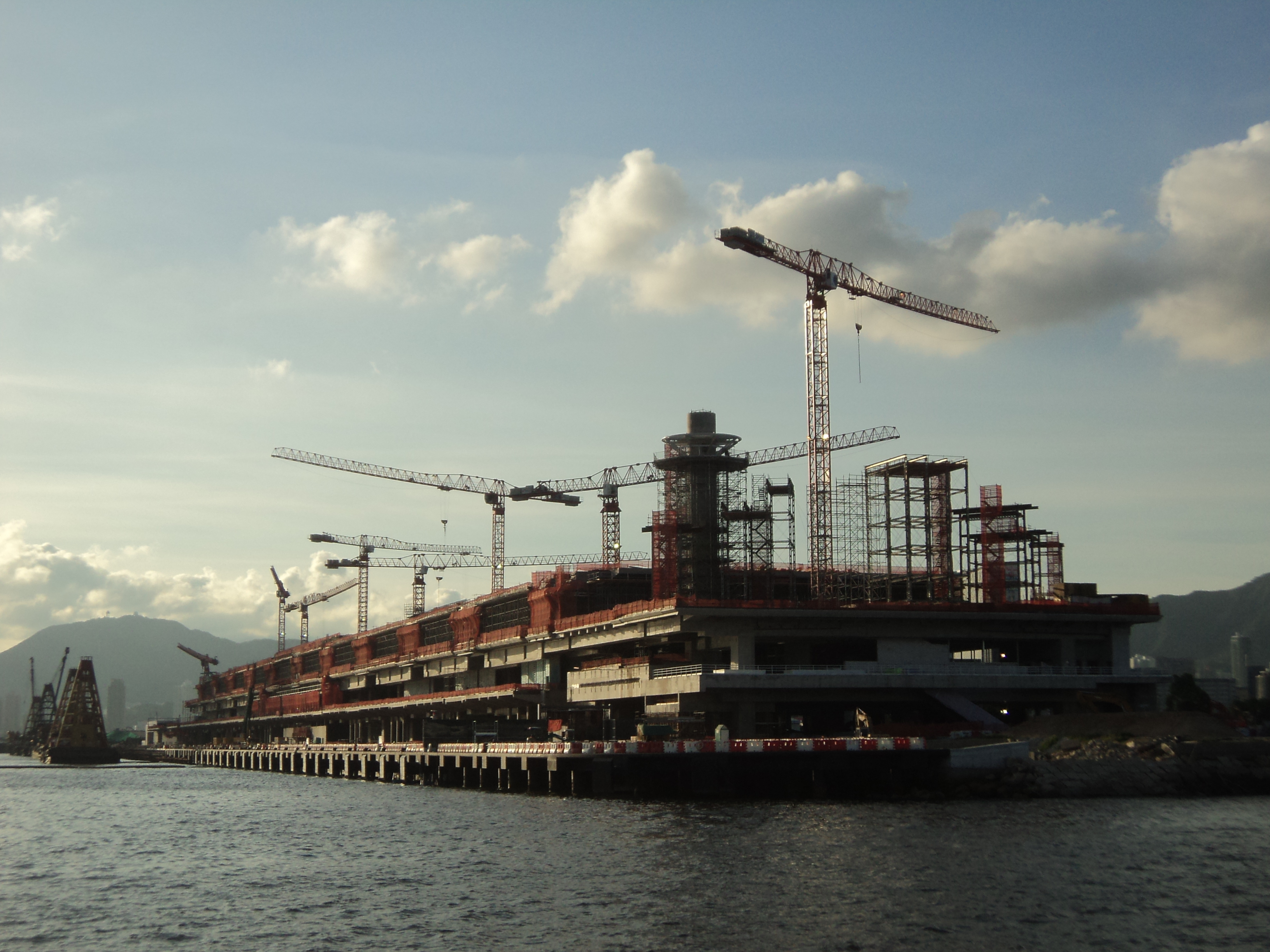
Kai Tak Cruise Terminal under construction in July 2012

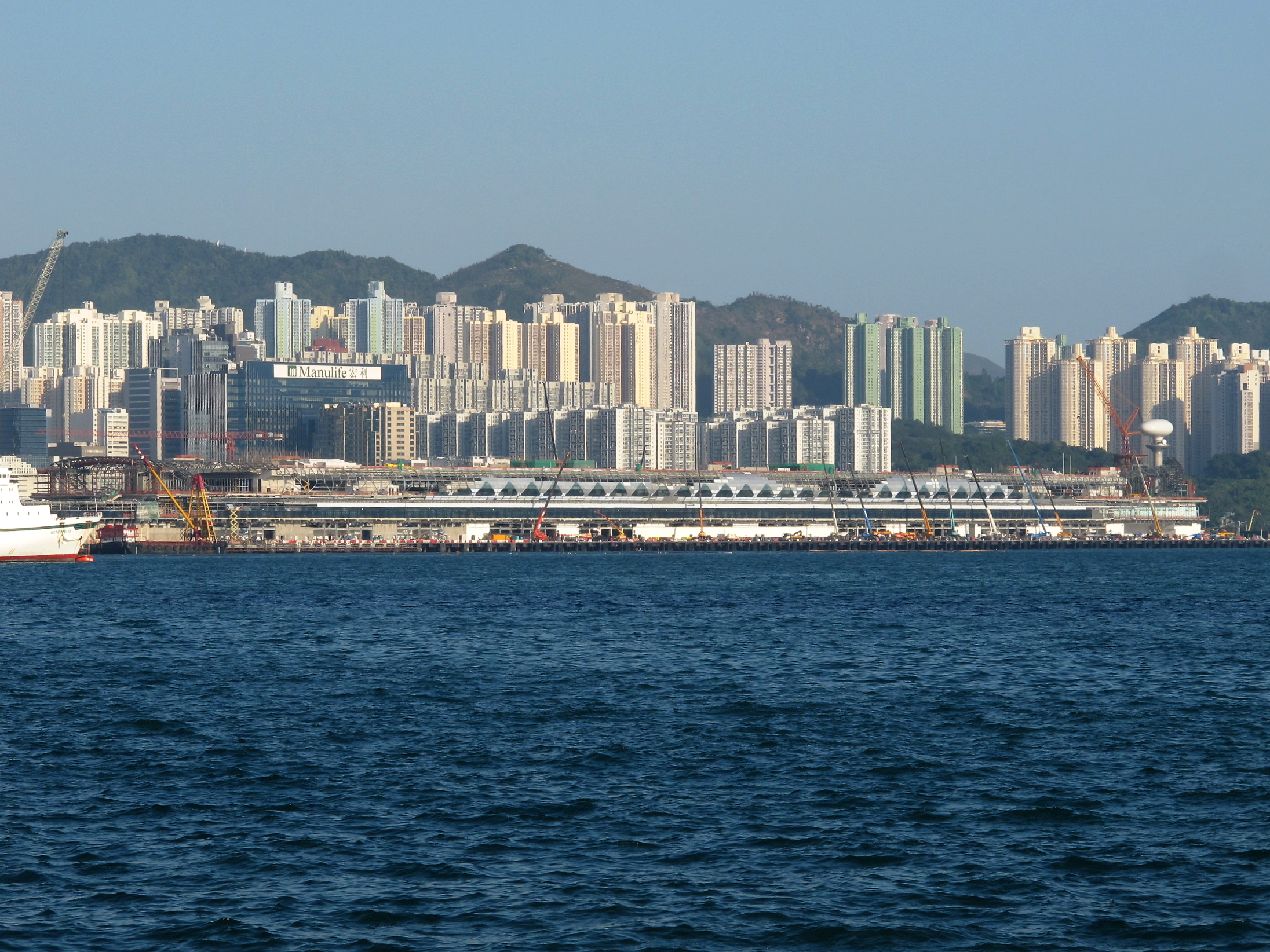
Kai Tak Cruise Terminal under construction in December 2012

=== Architectural design ===
The cruise terminal was designed by architects Foster + Partners. The terminal currently has the capacity to disembark a total of 8,400 (peak design load) or 5400 (base design load) passengers and 1,200 crew and its design also anticipates the demands of a new generation of larger cruise liners currently being designed. The interior, which spans 70 metres (230 ft), can be converted into a venue for performances, events and exhibitions, supported by the terminal's restaurants and shops. This flexibility ensures that the building will be used all year round and can fully utilize down time. The sustainable design combines a number of energy-saving measures, and will generate power from renewable sources, as well as making use of recycled rain water for cooling.

The design, routing and functionality of the new terminal are based on the much smaller Passenger Terminal Amsterdam (PTA) in Amsterdam, the Netherlands. Partner in the Bouygues-led consortium which won the tender, is Amsterdam Port Consultants (APC) which consists of Haven Amsterdam, the government owner of the PTA terminal, and Ingenieursbureau Lievense, which was responsible for the design of PTA. The Dutch terminal, PTA, although smaller was chosen as a model for the new Hong Kong terminal on the basis of PTA's multifunctionality.

== Operation and management ==
On 8 March 2012, the Worldwide Cruise Terminals Consortium was awarded the right to operate and manage the cruise terminal at Kai Tak. The consortium is required to pay the government a fixed rent of around HK$13 million for the 10-year operation. In addition, the government will receive a percentage of the operator's gross receipts as variable rent, with the percentage increasing from 7.3 per cent to 34 per cent as gross receipts rise. The grouping is made up of Worldwide Flight Services, Royal Caribbean Cruises and Neo Crown. Mariner of the Seas was the first cruise ship to dock at the new terminal on 12 June 2013.

== Home port ==
Roughly 80% of the ship calls at the Kai Tak Cruise Terminal have been turnaround or 'homeporting' calls. The first major homeport season was by Voyager of the Seas, which was based at Kai Tak from June to October 2015.

== Lines ==
The Kai Tak Cruise Terminal ("KTCT") commenced operation in 2013 and has since welcomed cruise ships from a wide variety of cruise lines. Lines calling or scheduled to call at the KTCT include:

- Azamara Club Cruises
- AIDA Cruises
- Carnival Cruise Line
- Celebrity Cruises
- Costa Cruises
- Cruise and Maritime Voyages
- Cunard
- Dream Cruises
- Fred. Olsen Cruise Lines
- Hapag-Lloyd Cruises
- Holland America
- Norwegian Cruise Line
- Oceania Cruises
- Peace Voyages
- Phoenix Reisen
- Plantours Cruises
- Princess Cruises
- Regent Seven Seas Cruises
- Royal Caribbean International
- Seabourn Cruise Line
- Semester at Sea
- Silversea Cruises
- Star Cruises
- TUI Cruises
- Viking Cruise Line
- Voyages of Discovery
- Windstar Cruises

== Year-on-year development ==
Kai Tak Cruise Terminal Year-On-Year Development
| | Jun–Dec 2013 | 2014 | 2015 | 2016 | 2017 |
| Revenue Passengers | 35,322 | 100,866 | 228,809 | 372,946 | 732,586 |
| Monthly Avg | 5,046 | 8,046 | 19,067 | 31,079 | 61,049 |
| Lines Calling | 4 | 8 | 9 | 18 | 16 |
| Total Calls | 9 | 28 | 56 | 95 | 190 |
| Turns | 4 | 17 | 43 | 69 | 161 |
| Transits | 5 | 11 | 13 | 26 | 29 |
| Call Months | 4 of 7 | 10 | 11 | 12 | 12 |
| Ship Days/ Utilization | 15 | 49 | 75 | 120 | 216 |

* confirmed bookings as of Jan 2018

Passenger numbers based on ship’s declarations and do not include crew
