= Aroya (ship) =

Cruise ship

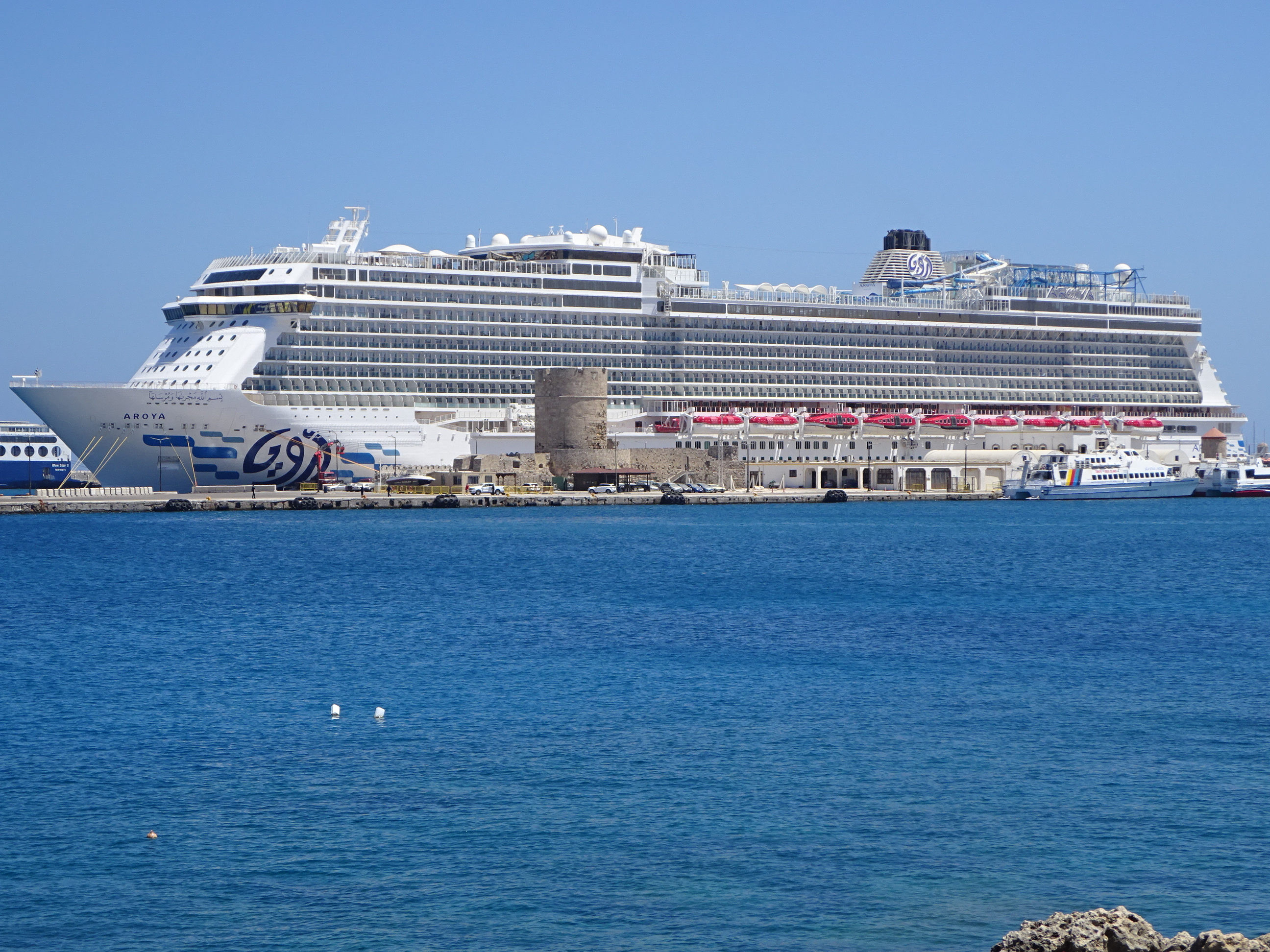
- Aroya in Rhodes in July 2025

History
- Name: World Dream (2017–2023); Manara (2023–2024); Aroya (2024—present)
- Owner: 2017–2022: Genting Hong Kong; 2023–present: Cruise Saudi
- Operator: 2017–2022: Dream Cruises; 2024–present: Aroya Cruises
- Port of registry: Valletta, Malta
- Ordered: 10 February 2014
- Builder: Meyer Werft
- Yard number: S.712
- Laid down: 29 July 2015
- Launched: 26 August 2017
- Christened: 17 November 2017
- Completed: 26 October 2017
- Maiden voyage: 19 November 2017
- In service: 2017
- Out of service: 2 March 2022
- Identification: Call sign: C6BO4; IMO number: 9733117; MMSI number: 249010000
- Status: In service

General characteristics
- Class & type: Genting-class cruise ship
- Tonnage: 150,695 GT
- Length: 335.2 m (1,099 ft 9 in)
- Beam: 44.35 m (145 ft 6 in) max; 39.75 m (130 ft 5 in) waterline
- Height: 61 m (200 ft)
- Draft: 8.622 m (28 ft 3.4 in)
- Depth: 11.417 m (37 ft 5.5 in)
- Decks: 18
- Installed power: 2 × MAN 14V48/60CR (16,800 kW); 3 × MAN 12V48/60CR (14,400 kW); 1 × CAT 3516 (1,500 kW)
- Propulsion: 2 × ABB Azipod; 3 × Brunvoll FU115 bow thrusters
- Speed: 22.55 knots (41.76 km/h; 25.95 mph)
- Capacity: 5,000 passengers
- Crew: 1,925

Aroya is a cruise ship operated by Aroya Cruises of Saudi Arabia]. She was originally built for Star Cruises, but in the construction process she was transferred to Dream Cruises, in 2022 the ship was put up for sale and in 2023 was bought by Cruise Saudi. Since 2024 she has operated under the Aroya Cruises brand.

She was initially ordered under the name World Dream for Star Cruises and transferred to Dream Cruises during construction. The ship was designed for the Asian cruise market and has a large number of restaurants together with a casino and specially designed cabins. She was formally named on 17 November 2017 by Cecilia Lim, wife of Genting CEO Lim Kok Thay, who became godmother of the ship.

World Dream was sold to Cruises Saudi in 2023, and immediately renamed Manara. In July 2024, Aroya Cruises renamed her Aroya.

== History ==
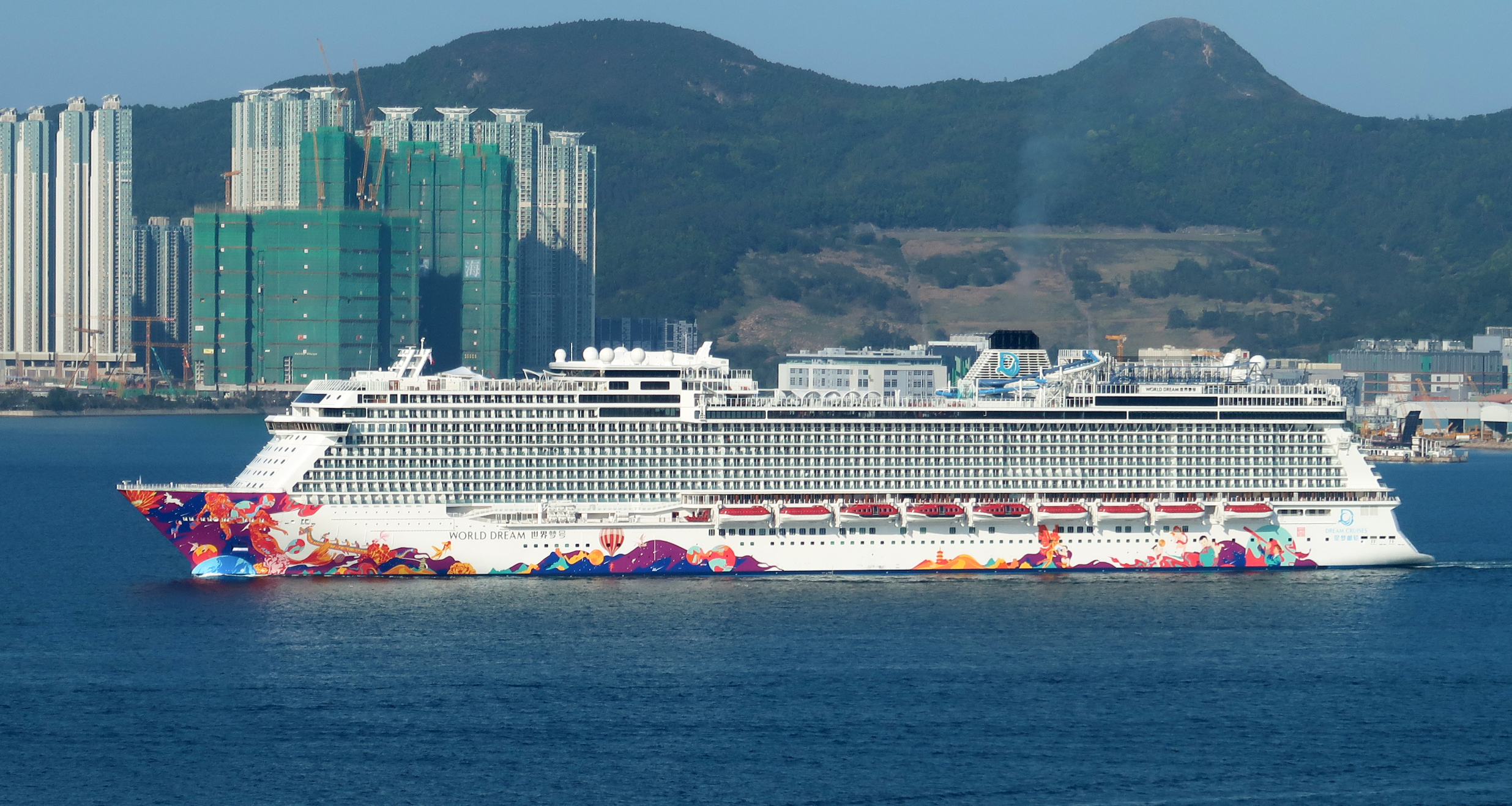
World Dream in Hong Kong in 2018

=== Construction and service ===
The ship was ordered in February 2014 for Star Cruises and was laid down on 29 July 2015. Construction started in February 2016. In November 2015, she was transferred to sister brand Dream Cruises before completion as World Dream She was launched on 26 August 2017 and completed on 26 October 2017. World Dream measures at 150,695 gross tons and is 335.2 metres (1,099 ft 9 in) long with a beam of 39.7 metres (130 ft 3 in). World Dream entered service for Dream Cruises in November 2017.

=== Coronavirus quarantine ===
Three passengers aboard World Dream during 19–24 January 2020 were confirmed to have been infected by COVID-19. On 5 February 2020, all 3,800 World Dream passengers and crew were put under quarantine on board the ship at Hong Kong's Kai Tak Cruise Terminal after Taiwan blocked its port of call in Kaohsiung. As of 7 February 2020, checks of those on board were ongoing.

The quarantine was lifted on 9 February 2020 after all 1,800 crew members tested negative for the virus. The majority of the passengers were not tested as they had had no contact with the infected Chinese passengers who had been on the ship during the 19–24 January sailing. On 26 February the Indonesian government evacuated their 188 citizens from World Dream using the hospital ship KRI dr. Soeharso. All Indonesians that were aboard the cruise ship were taken to Sebaru Kecil Island, which is part of the Thousand Islands Regency in Jakarta. After that, they underwent 14 days of quarantine and observation.

=== Auction and refit ===
Following the insolvency of parent company Genting Hong Kong, Dream Cruises collapsed. On 1 March 2022, it was announced that World Dream would cease operations the next day after its last sailing return to shores. World Dream was then laid up in Singapore and sold at auction with sealed bids due by 21 December 2022.

In March 2023, the ship was finally sold to Cruise Saudi and renamed Manara. In June of that year, Manara arrived in Bremerhaven for an extensive refit at the shipyard Bredo.

The ship was sold at an auction for about US$355 million with Meyer Werft being involved in the modification.

The ship was renamed Aroya, which is a combination of the words Arabian and roya, translating to vision or dream.

She started operations in December 2024.

== Lego model ==
On 16 November 2017, Dream Cruises created an 8.44-metre (27 ft 8 in) Lego model of the ship, the largest such model of a cruise ship, which was put on display at the Kai Tak Cruise Terminal in Hong Kong.
