= SuperStar Libra =

Cruise ship built in 1988

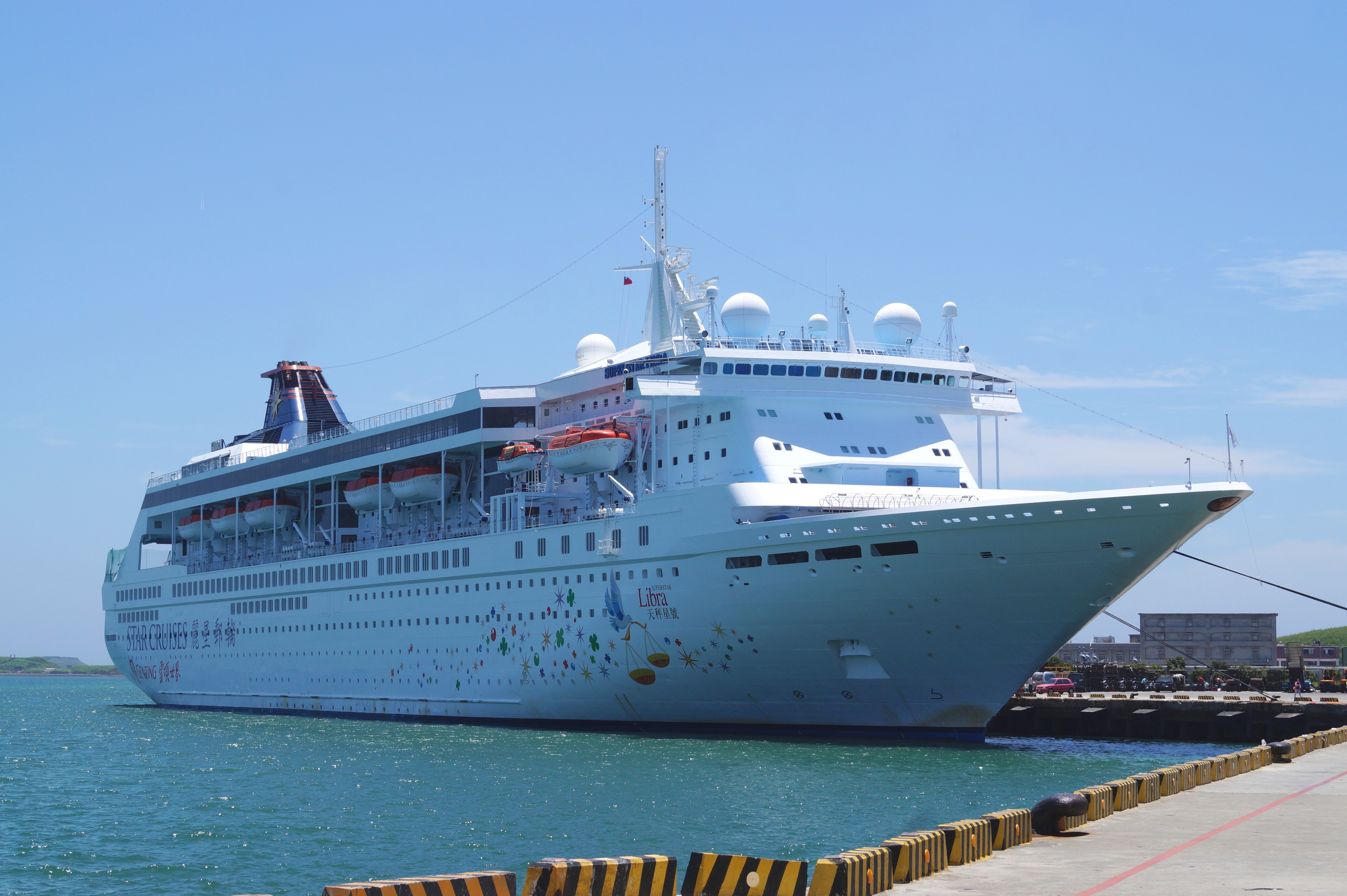
- SuperStar Libra

History
- Name: 1988–1997: Seaward; 1997–2005: Norwegian Sea; 2005–2022: SuperStar Libra; 2022: Libra
- Operator: 1988–2005: Norwegian Cruise Line; 2005–2018: Star Cruises; 2018–2022: MV Werften
- Port of registry: Lomé, Togo, Togo
- Builder: Wärtsilä Marine Perno Shipyard
- Yard number: 1294
- Launched: 14 November 1987
- Completed: 16 May 1988
- Maiden voyage: 1988
- In service: 1988
- Out of service: June 2018
- Home port: Penang, Malaysia
- Identification: IMO number: 8612134; MMSI number: 308188000; Callsign: C6DM2
- Fate: Scrapped in Aliağa, Turkey in 2022
- Notes: Beached for scrap

General characteristics
- Class & type: Libra Class
- Type: Cruise Ship
- Tonnage: 42,275 GT
- Length: 709 ft (216 m)
- Beam: 93 ft (28 m)
- Decks: 10
- Capacity: 1,480 passengers; 740 cabins
- Crew: 740

SuperStar Libra was a cruise ship owned and last operated by Star Cruises. She was built in 1988 at Wärtsilä Marine Perno Shipyard in Turku, Finland as Seaward for Norwegian Cruise Line. In 1997 she was renamed Norwegian Sea, remaining in NCL fleet. In 2005 she was transferred to the fleet of Star Cruises. In May 2022, the ship, renamed Libra, arrived in Turkey for demolition.

== History ==
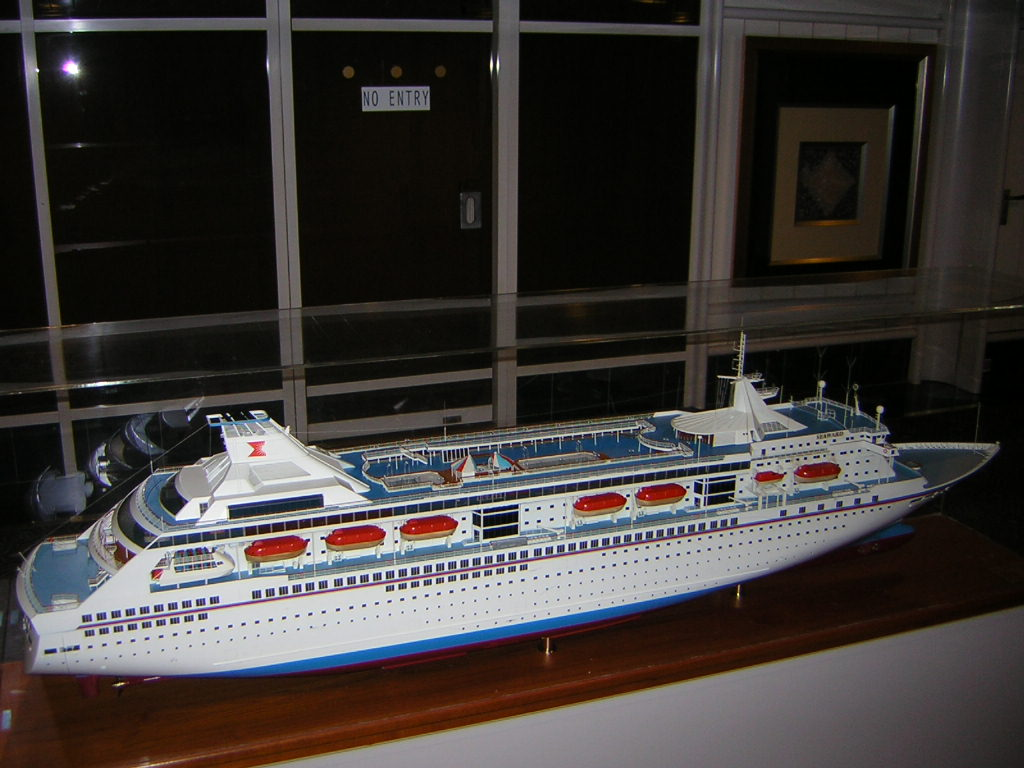
A model of Seaward.

The vessel entered operation with Norwegian Cruise Line (NCL) in 1988 as Seaward. The vessel was renamed Norwegian Sea in 1997. In 2005, the vessel was transferred to Star Cruises, part of the Genting Group, and renamed SuperStar Libra.

With Star Cruises, SuperStar Libra sailed a variety of cruises in the Mediterranean, Adriatic, Aegean and Guatemalan seas in the summer of 2006. The vessel deployed back to Mumbai in late September 2006. SuperStar Libra has subsequently been based at various ports in Asia including Singapore, Penang, Hong Kong, Xiamen and Haiku.

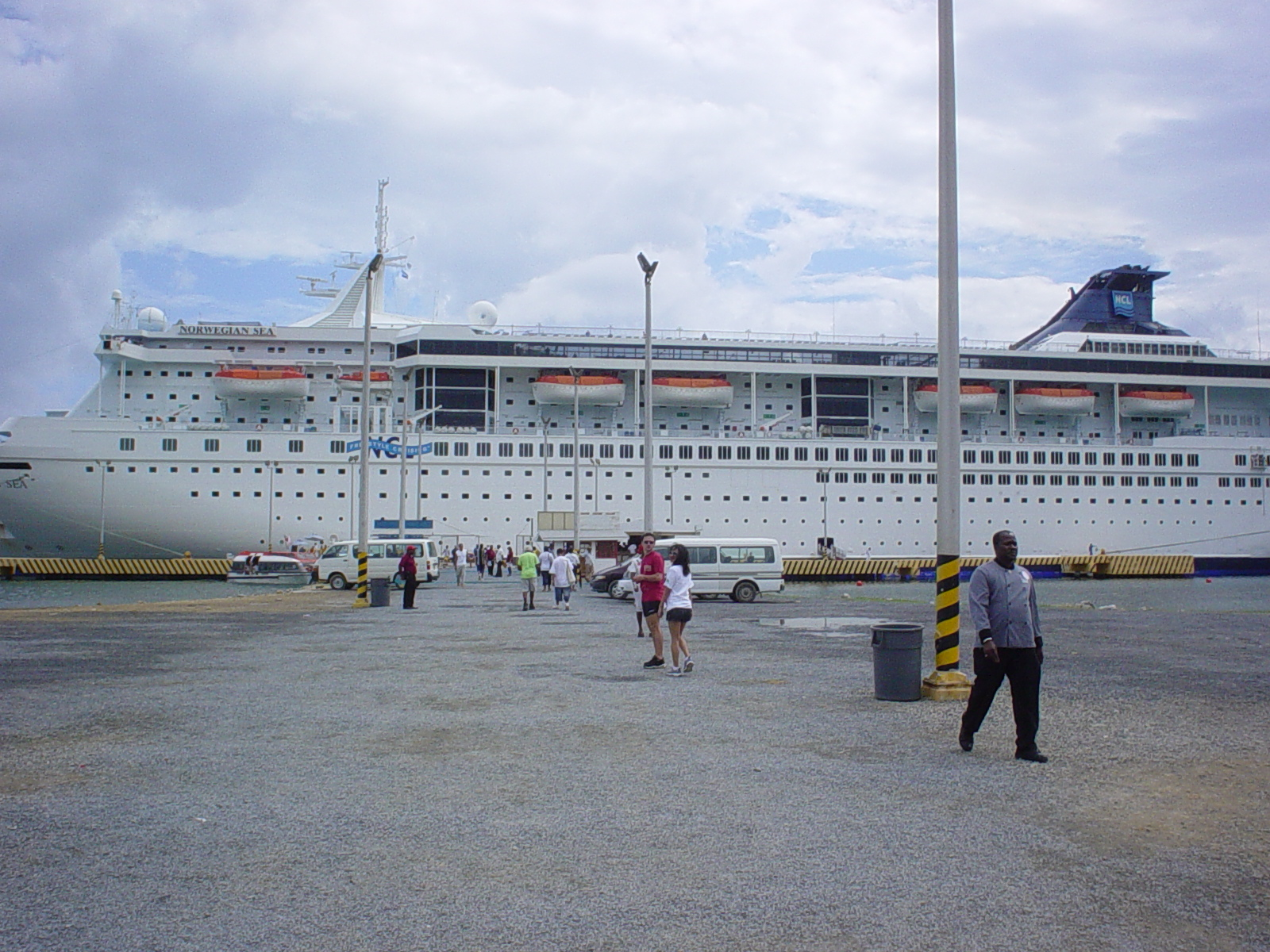
Norwegian Sea in Roatan, Honduras.

== Accommodation vessel ==
In March 2018, Star Cruises announced that SuperStar Libra would end her public cruise operations for the company in June 2018. From July 2018, SuperStar Libra was used as an accommodation ship for workers at the MV Werften shipyard of the Genting-Hong-Kong-group in Wismar, Germany to support the construction of ships for Genting's Dream Cruises and Crystal Cruises. She remained there under a 3-year lease.

SuperStar Libra was moved to another berth in Wismar harbour in November 2021. On 4 February 2022, it was announced that the ship's operator, Star Cruises Germany GmbH, was insolvent, and she was sold to Flash Maritime Ltd, which is associated with the Greek company Hellenic Seaways. On 11 April 2022 she departed Wismar in tow for Greece, reportedly to continue as an accommodation vessel, but was resold for demolition at Aliağa, Turkey, departing Salamis in tow on 28 May. The ship arrived in Aliağa and was beached on 1 June.

== Popular culture ==
- The vessel appeared as Norwegian Sea in the 2003 film 2 Fast 2 Furious.
