= Star Navigator =

Cruise ship built in 1999

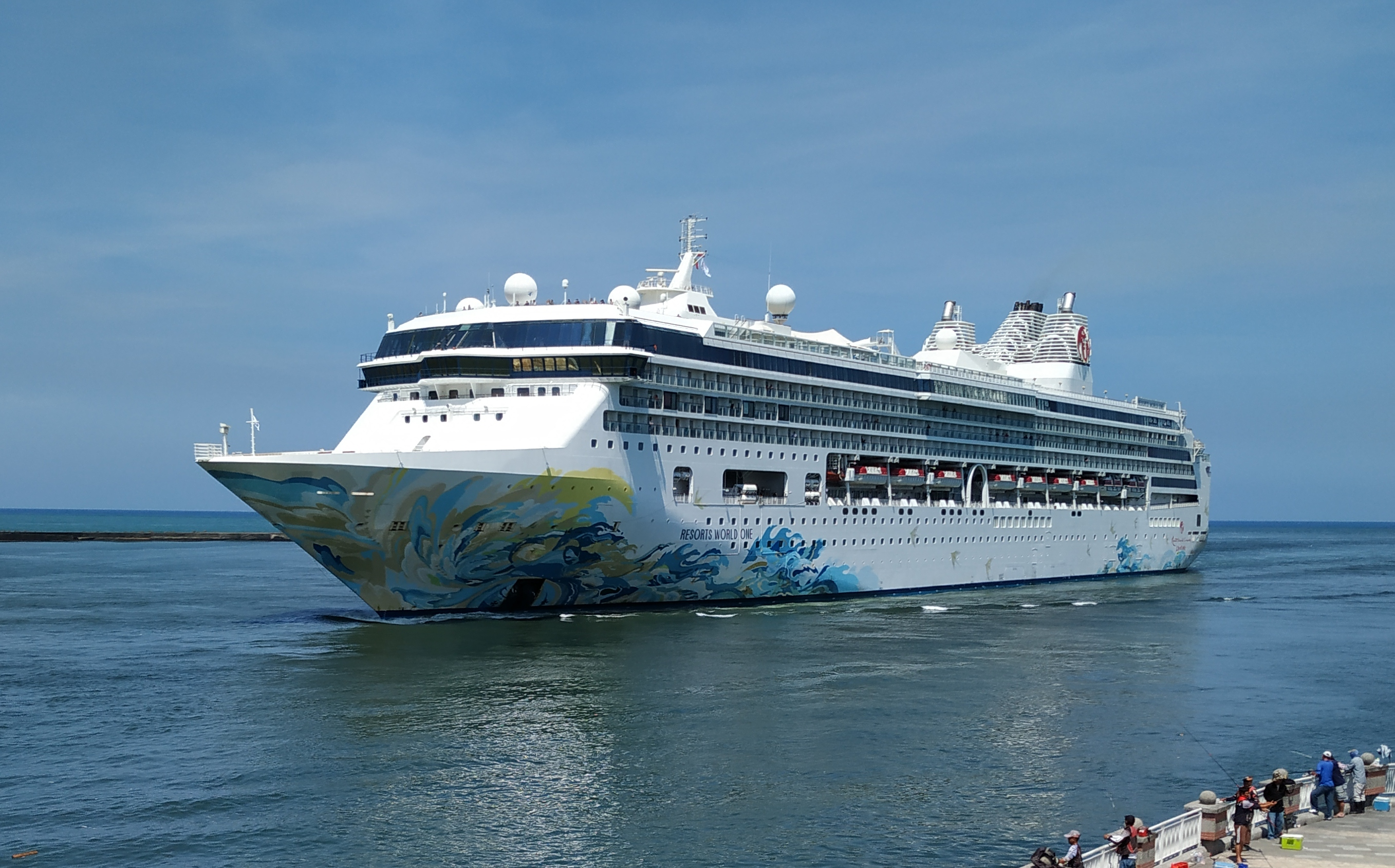
- As Resorts World One entering Sizihwan at Kaohsiung, Taiwan on 5 June 2023

History
- Name: 1999–2019: SuperStar Virgo; 2019–2023: Explorer Dream; 2023–2025: Resorts World One; March 2025: Star Navigator
- Owner: 1999–2019: Star Cruises; 2019–2021: Dream Cruises; 2022–present: V.Ships Leisure
- Operator: 1999–2019: Star Cruises; 2019–2022: Dream Cruises; 2023–2025: Resorts World Cruises; May 2025: StarCruises
- Port of registry: 1999–2014: Panama City, Panama; 2014–present: Nassau, Bahamas
- Ordered: 22 November 1995
- Builder: Meyer Werft, Papenburg, Germany
- Cost: $350 million
- Yard number: 647
- Laid down: 18 November 1996
- Launched: 23 December 1998
- Completed: 1 August 1999
- Acquired: 2 August 1999
- In service: 10 October 1999
- Identification: Call sign: C6AV6; IMO number: 9141077; MMSI number: 311000165
- Status: In service

General characteristics
- Class & type: Leo-class cruise ship
- Tonnage: 75,338 GT; 8,530 DWT
- Length: 268.60 m (881 ft 3 in)
- Beam: 32.2 m (105 ft 8 in)
- Height: 49.6 m (162 ft 9 in)
- Draught: 8.40 m (27 ft 7 in)
- Depth: 11.50 m (37 ft 9 in)
- Decks: 13 (10 passenger accessible)
- Installed power: 4 × MAN-B&W 14V48/60 diesel engines; 58,800 kW (78,900 hp) (combined)
- Propulsion: 2 propellers; 3 thrusters (2 bow, 1 stern)
- Speed: 25.5 knots (47.2 km/h; 29.3 mph) (maximum)
- Capacity: 1,856 passengers (lower berths); 2,800 passengers (all berths)
- Crew: 1,300

Star Navigator is a Leo-class cruise ship operating for StarCruises. The vessel was built in 1999 by the Meyer Werft shipyard in Papenburg, Germany as SuperStar Virgo for Star Cruises. The ship also previously operated with Dream Cruises as Explorer Dream and as Resorts World One for Resorts World Cruises.

== Concept and construction ==
SuperStar Virgo was ordered by Star Cruises on 22 November 1995 as Hull 647 from the Meyer Werft shipyard in Papenburg, Germany as the second ship of the Leo class, and the second new build for Star Cruises. She was designed specifically for the Asian cruise market. The keel of the SuperStar Virgo was laid on 18 November 1996, and she was floated out of dry dock on 23 December 1998. On 28 June 1999, the ship left the shipyard heading towards the North Sea on the River Ems. She was delivered to Star Cruises on 2 August 1999, four weeks earlier then contracted.

== Service history ==
=== SuperStar Virgo ===
Following the transit from Papenburg to Singapore the SuperStar Virgo entered service on cruises from Singapore on 10 October 1999. On 24 April 2003 the SuperStar Virgo was relocated from Singapore to operate cruises out of Perth, Western Australia due to the outbreak of the severe acute respiratory syndrome (SARS) in Southeast Asia. Initially the redeployment was planned to last for a one-month evaluation period, but SuperStar Virgo continued to be based at Perth until July 2003.

On 2 April 2008 SuperStar Virgo relocated from Singapore to Hong Kong as her port of departure until 26 October 2008, the redeployment coinciding with the 2008 Summer Olympics in Beijing. She returned to Singapore in October 2008. In January 2009, Star Cruises installed a 100-metre (330 ft) waterslide on SuperStar Virgo during her dry dock period in Singapore, and in January 2012, received new hull art and livery.

Between April and October 2014 she was based at Hong Kong. From 13 November to 31 December 2015, SuperStar Virgo undertook a 48-day cruise to the Southern Hemisphere with over 20 ports of call. From 3 January to 11 November 2016, SuperStar Virgo was homeported at Nansha, Guangzhou, and Hong Kong. From November to December 2016, she continued to be based at Hong Kong. From January to March 2017, she was based at Shenzhen and cruised to Vietnamese ports and Hong Kong.

=== Explorer Dream ===
SuperStar Virgo was transferred to Dream Cruises and following a US$65 million refit at Sembawang Shipyard in Singapore, was renamed Explorer Dream in late 2018. She operated from Australia during the 2019–20 cruise season. In April, the vessel was re-homeported at Shanghai, where the vessel was re-christened with Grace Chen as the ship's godmother. In October 2019, Explorer Dream sailed to Australia for the first time, stationing at Sydney from October to December 2019. The ship was supposed to return to the northern Asian market for mid-2020, but due to the COVID-19 pandemic all sailings were cancelled, with a planned return to service in October 2020 in Australia. However, by the end of March, the planned sailings from Australia were also cancelled. After being the first cruise ship to receive the Certification in Infection Prevention for the Marine industry (CIP-M) from the maritime classification society DNV GL, Explorer Dream became the first cruise ship reactivated during the pandemic in June. In July the vessel arrived at Keelung, Taiwan, providing island hopping cruises among the Taiwanese islands Penghu, Matsu, Kinmen, and Hualien.

=== Resorts World One ===
Following the collapse of Genting Hong Kong, the owner of the Dream Cruises brand, in January 2022, Explorer Dream was laid up off the coast of Port Klang, Malaysia, in March. It was announced on 13 January 2023 that the vessel had been sold to an unknown buyer and that the ship was chartered to the new cruise company Resorts World Cruises as the second ship in their fleet. The vessel was renamed Resorts World One and entered service on 17 February, briefly taken over cruises for fleetmate Genting Dream which headed to dry dock. On 1 March 2023, the ship repositioned to Hong Kong where it sailed 2, 3 and 5-night cruises.

=== Star Navigator ===
In February 2025 Resorts World Cruises announced it split its brand back into a new Star Cruises now (now stylized as "StarCruises") and Dream Cruises. The ship was assigned to StarCruises and renamed Star Navigator. The vessel's first sailing departed Singapore on 4 March before moving to Taiwan for a period of eight months, sailing to Japan and South Korea.

== Gallery ==
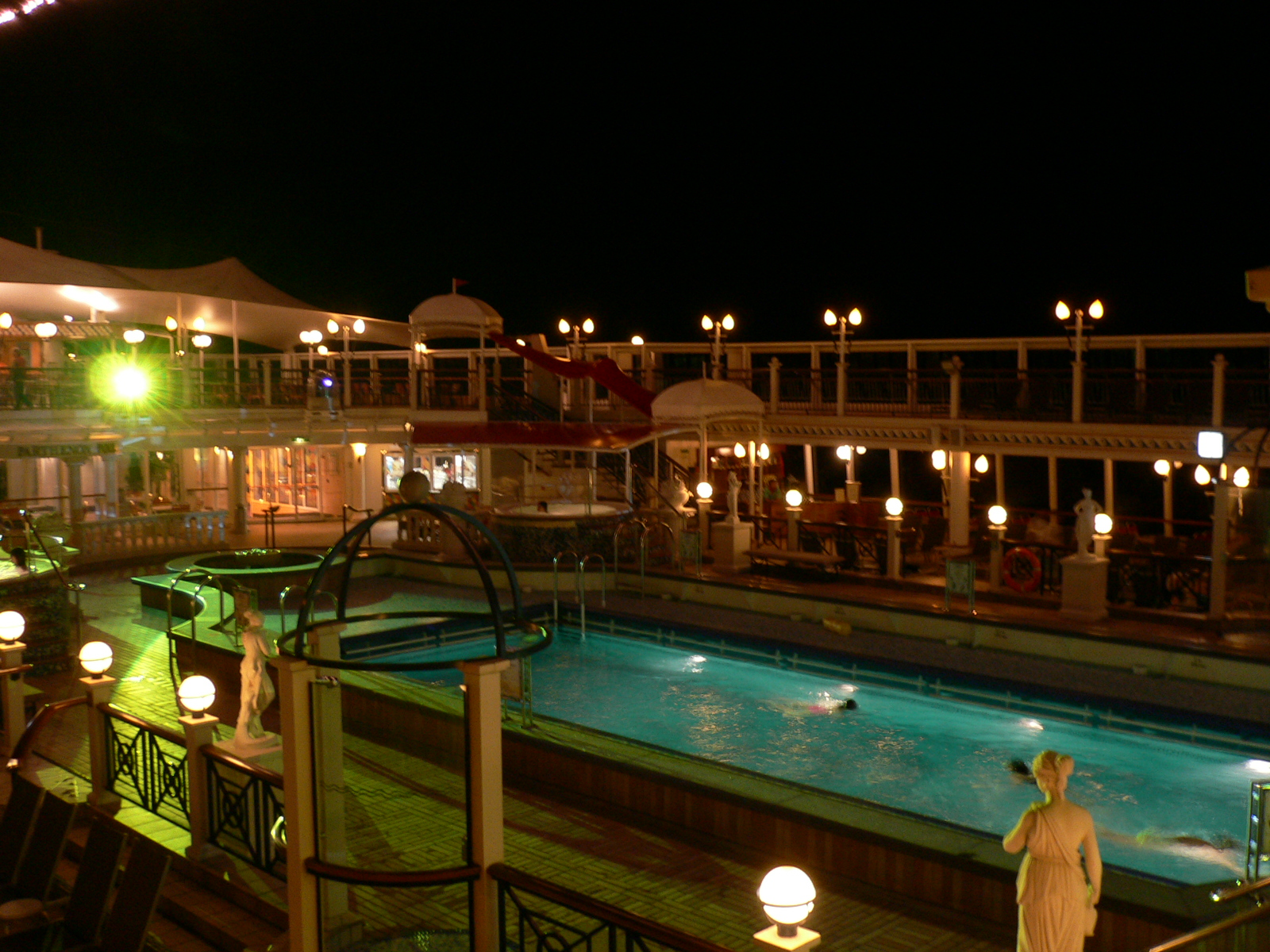
Parthenon Pool onboard SuperStar Virgo

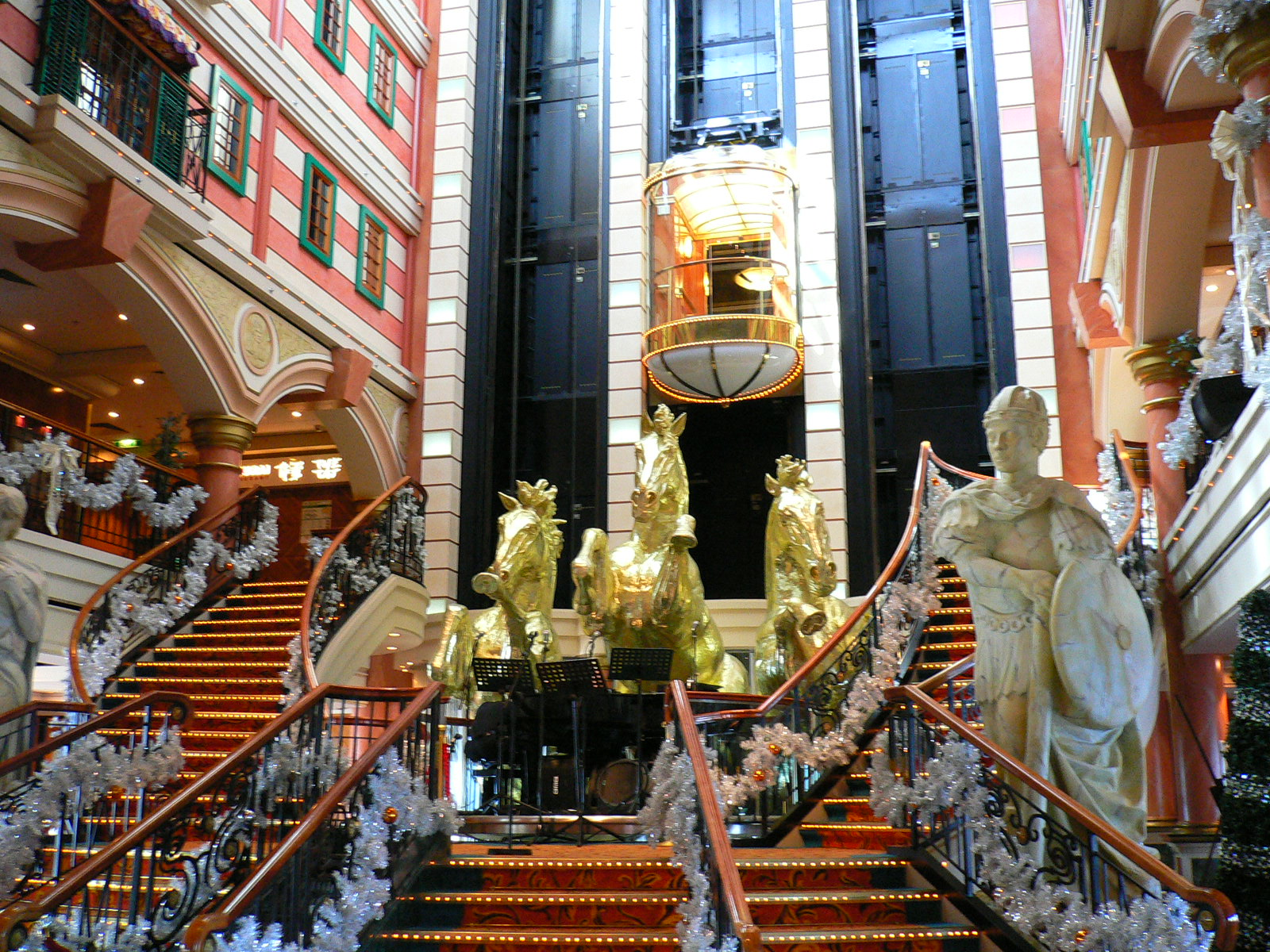
SuperStar Virgo's Grand Piazza

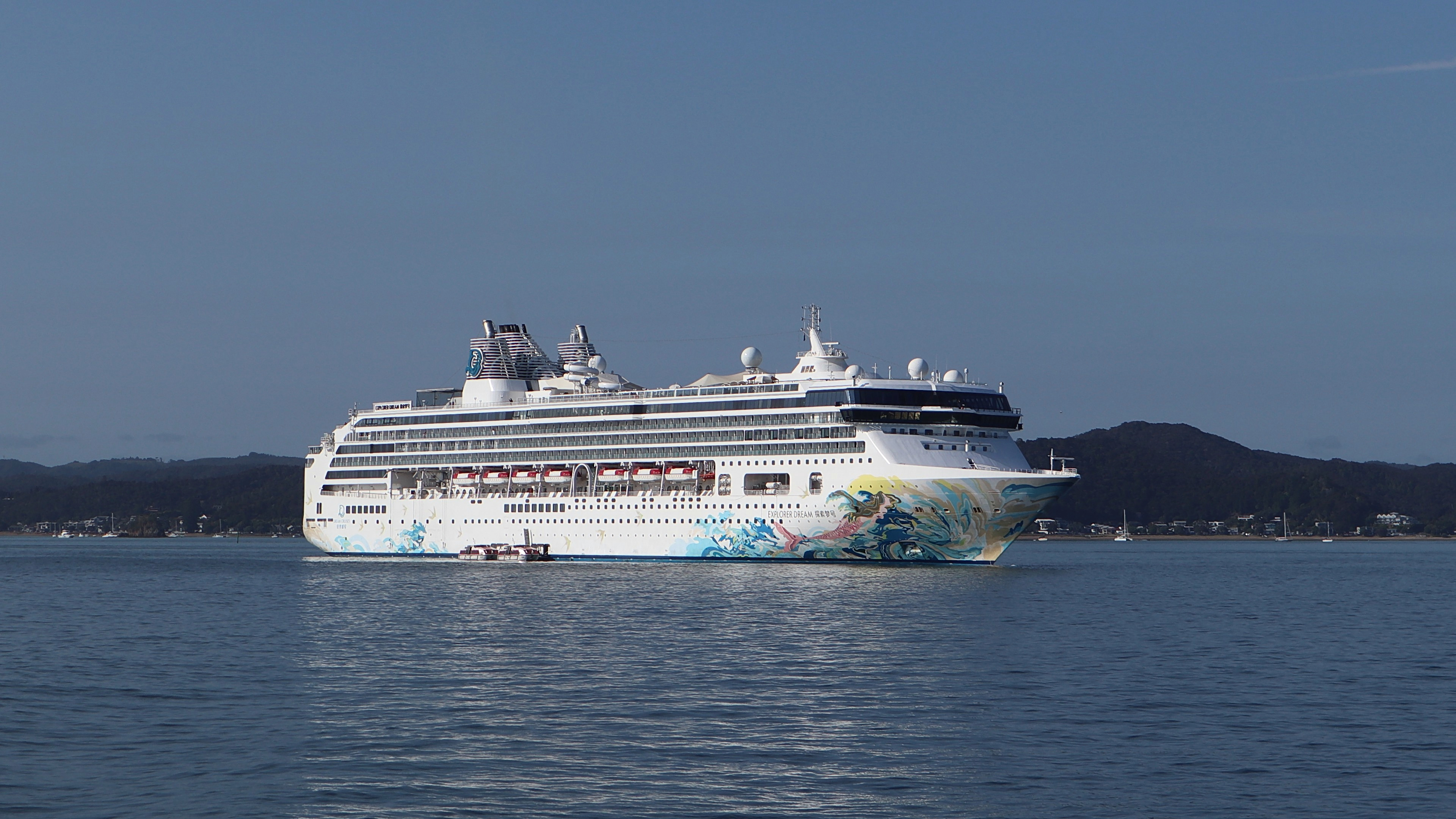
Explorer Dream anchored in Bay of Islands, New Zealand

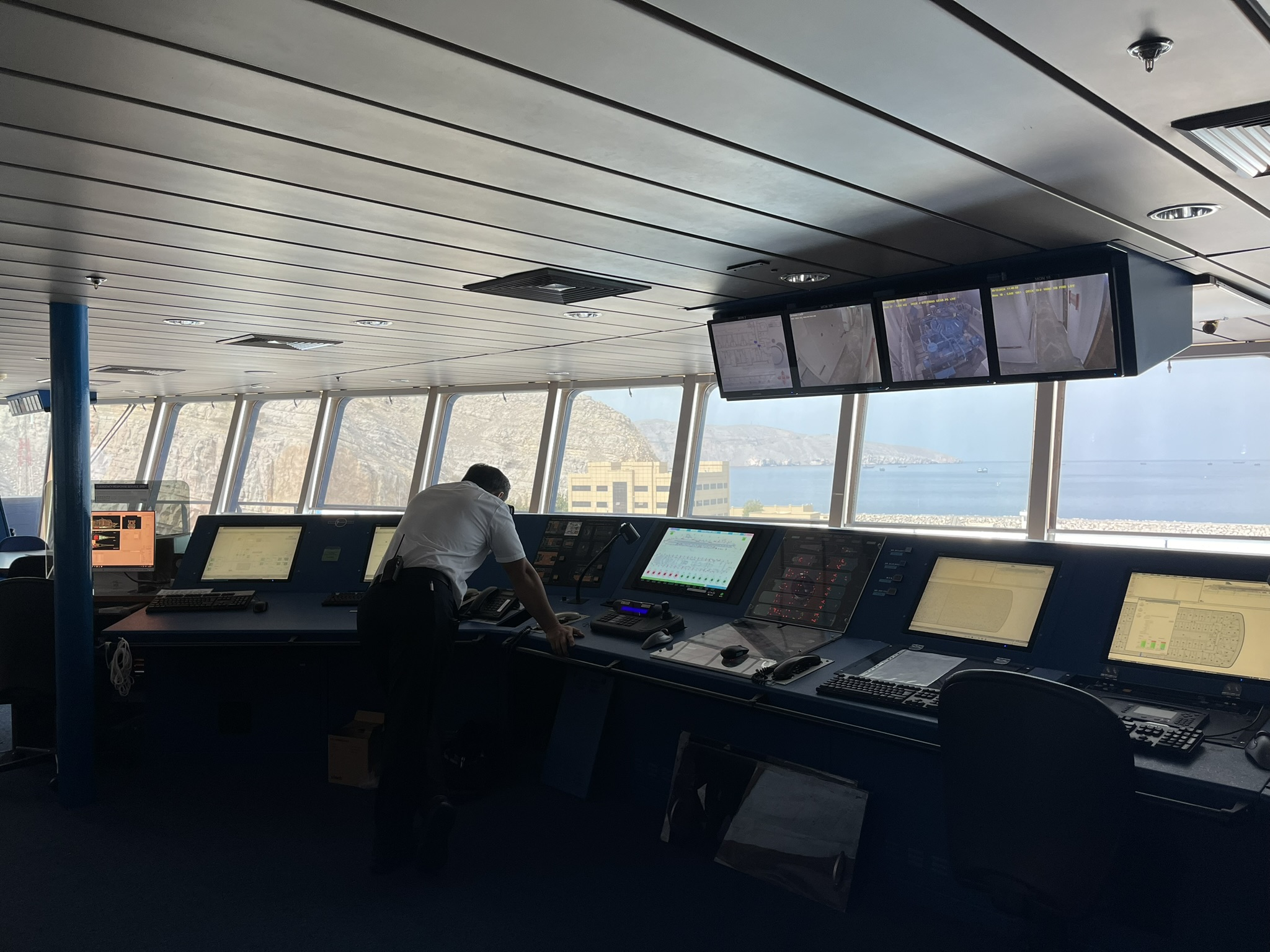
Captain's bridge onboard Resorts World One
