= MOB boat =

Small rescue boat

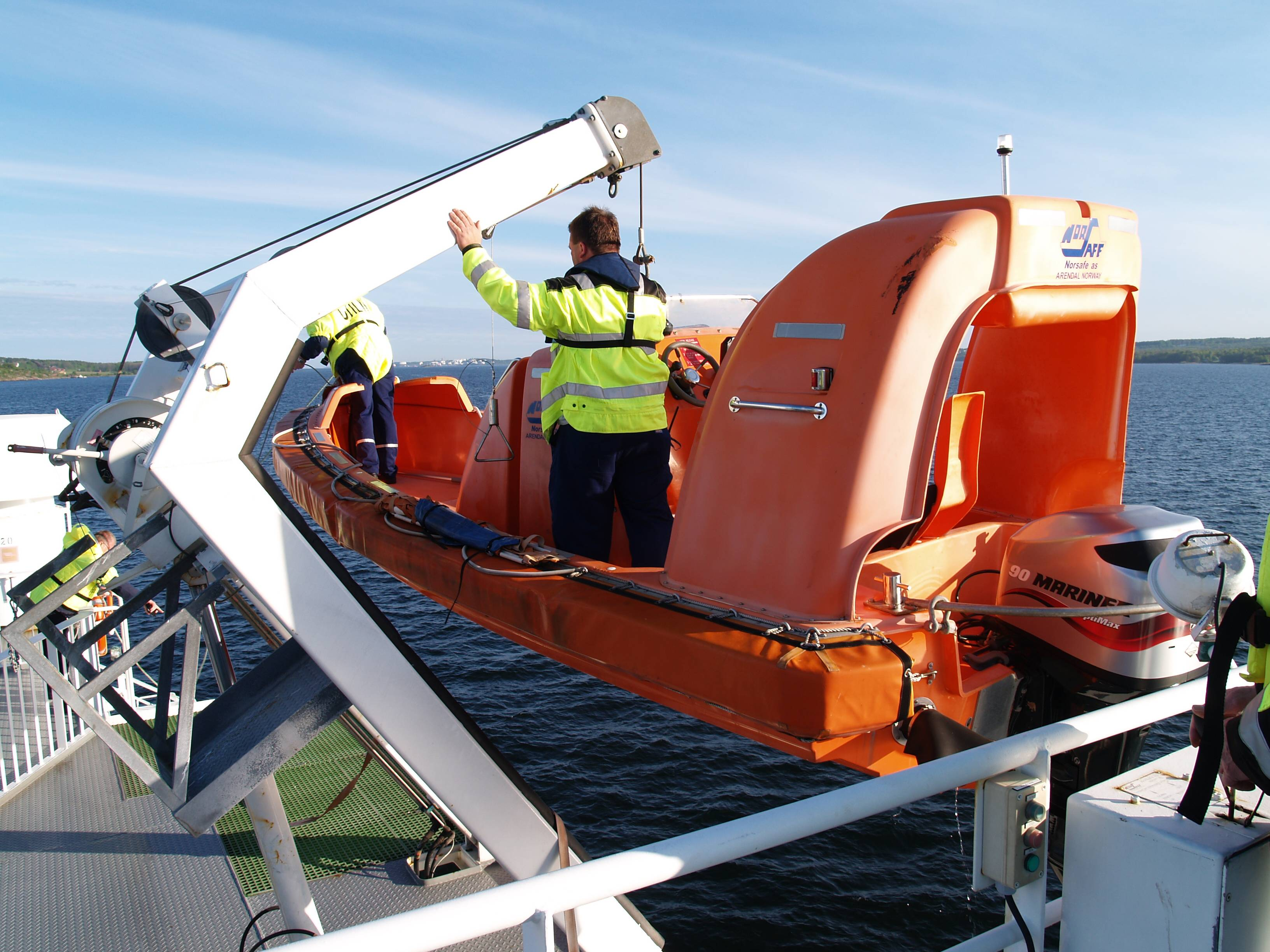
Launching a MOB boat from the ferry Boknafjord in Horten, Norway, May 2007

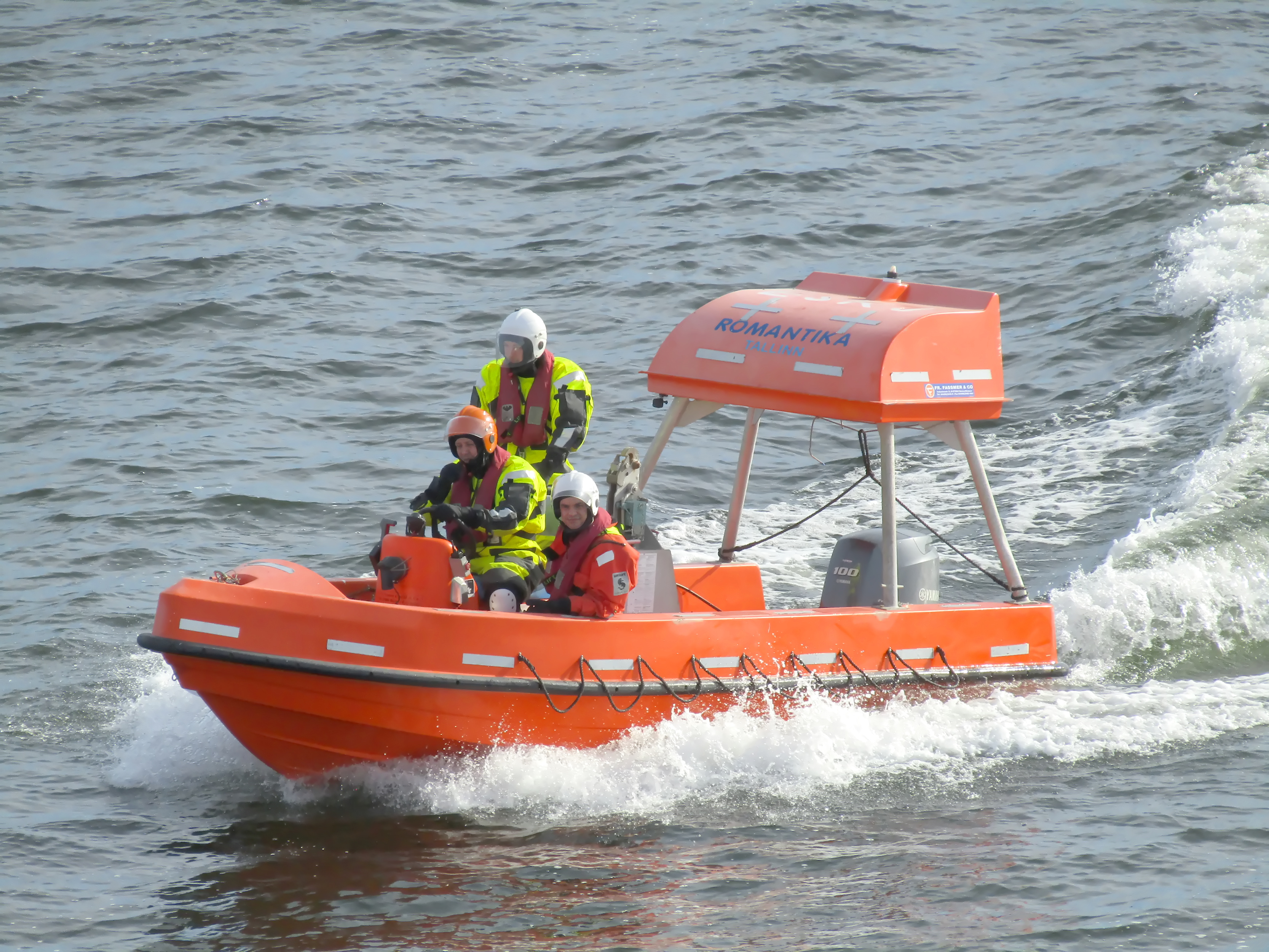
MOB boat for MS Romantika during practice exercises

A MOB, short for man overboard boat, is a small, fast rescue boat which large vessels, especially passenger ferries and cruise ships, use for man overboard situations. MOBs use diesel or gasoline-powered engines and are constructed of highly buoyant materials making them nearly unsinkable.

== Design ==
MOBs are constructed from fire-retardant polyester fibreglass resin. Due to the inherent buoyancy of the materials, the vessel is nearly unsinkable. Each boat seats five people with room for a sixth lying down on the floor. The MOBs can be powered by diesel outboard motors up to 36 horsepower (27 kW) or gasoline engines of 25–60 hp (19–45 kW). The MOB is usually davit-launched.

== Regulations ==
According to International Maritime Organization regulations, passenger ships that are less than 500 gross tonnage (GT) require one Rescue boat and those that are larger need to carry at least one rescue boat on each side of the ship. Roll-on/roll-off passenger ships require one Fast Rescue Craft (FRC) to be at least 6 metres (20 ft) in length and capable of 20 knots (37 km/h; 23 mph). Cargo ships need to carry one rescue boat.
