= StarCruises =

Cruise line

- Type: Subsidiary
- Industry: Passenger transportation & Cruises
- Founded: 10 November 1993; 32 years ago (original); 25 February 2025; 16 months ago (current)
- Founder: Tan Sri Lim Kok Thay
- Defunct: April 2022; 4 years ago (original)
- Fate: Revived as StarCruises
- Headquarters: Malaysia, Asia
- Area served: Asia Pacific
- Key people: Tan Sri Lim Kok Thay, CEO & Founder
- Products: Cruises
- Owner: Genting Hong Kong (until 2022); Resorts World Cruises (2022-2025); StarDream Cruises (from 2025)
- Website: StarDreamCruises.com

StarCruises (formerly Star Cruises) is a cruise line owned by the Malaysian company StarDream Cruises.

Previously it operated in the Asia-Pacific market and was owned by Genting Hong Kong. The chairman of Star Cruises was Tan Sri Lim Kok Thay, the son of Tan Sri Lim Goh Tong, who had founded Malaysia's Genting Highlands.

In April 2022 the parent company of Star Cruises, Genting Hong Kong, became bankrupt, and Thay, under the trading name Resorts World, bought the Star Cruises trademarks. In February 2025, Resorts World Cruises announced that the brand will be reformed as StarCruises under StarDream Cruises together with sister brand Dream Cruises.

== History ==
The Star Cruises logo from 1992 to 2022.

=== 1992–1999: Founding, acquisitions ===
Star Cruises was founded as an associate of the Genting Group of Malaysia. It was incorporated in Bermuda on 10 November 1993 with its corporate headquarters in Hong Kong. The company's first ships were two cruiseferries acquired from the bankrupt Swedish company Rederi AB Slite. In the following years, the company purchased several other ships.

In 1998, Star Cruises took delivery of its first new build, SuperStar Leo, followed by sister ship SuperStar Virgo in 1999. Star Cruises also acquired Sun Cruises the same year.

=== 2000–2012: Norwegian Cruise Line, transfers ===
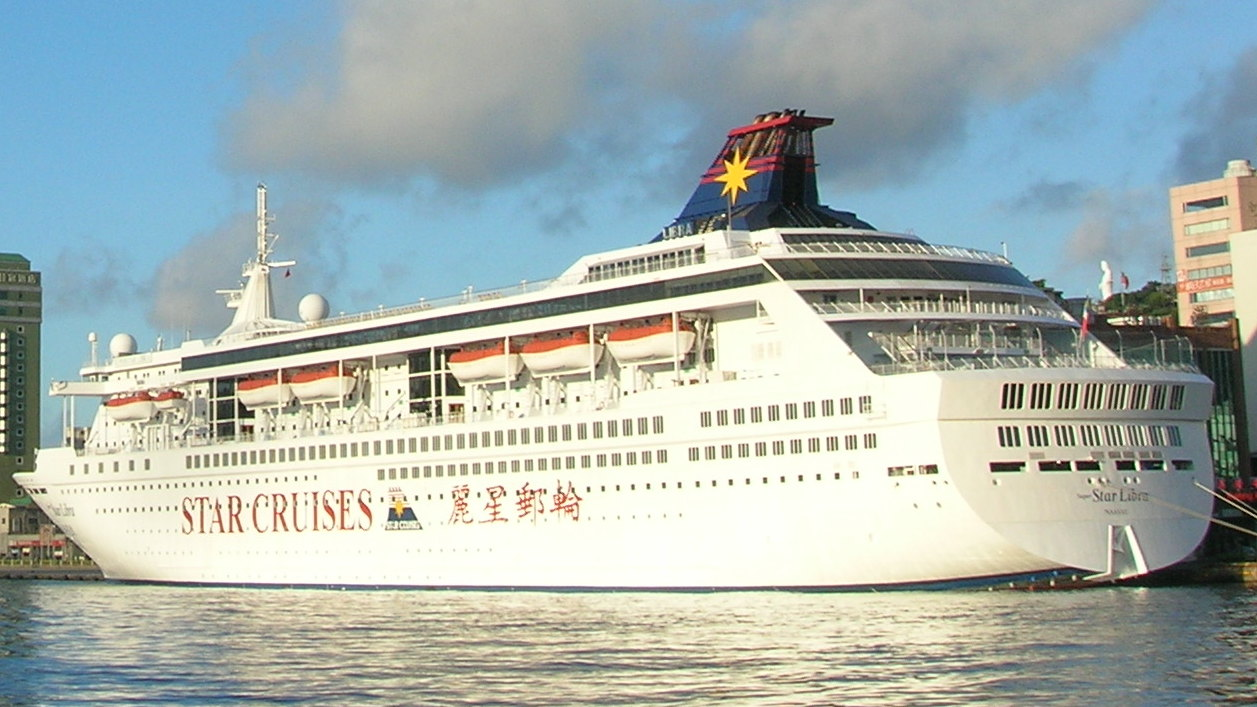
SuperStar Libra in Keelung Harbor, Taiwan

In 2000, Star Cruises acquired Norwegian Cruise Line (NCL), including its subsidiaries Orient Lines and Norwegian Capricorn Line, thus becoming the largest global cruise line in the world. NCL operations were soon merged into those of Star Cruises. Before the purchase of NCL, Star Cruises had had several other new builds either planned or already under construction, but with the merger of the two companies, most of the new ships joined the NCL fleet instead.

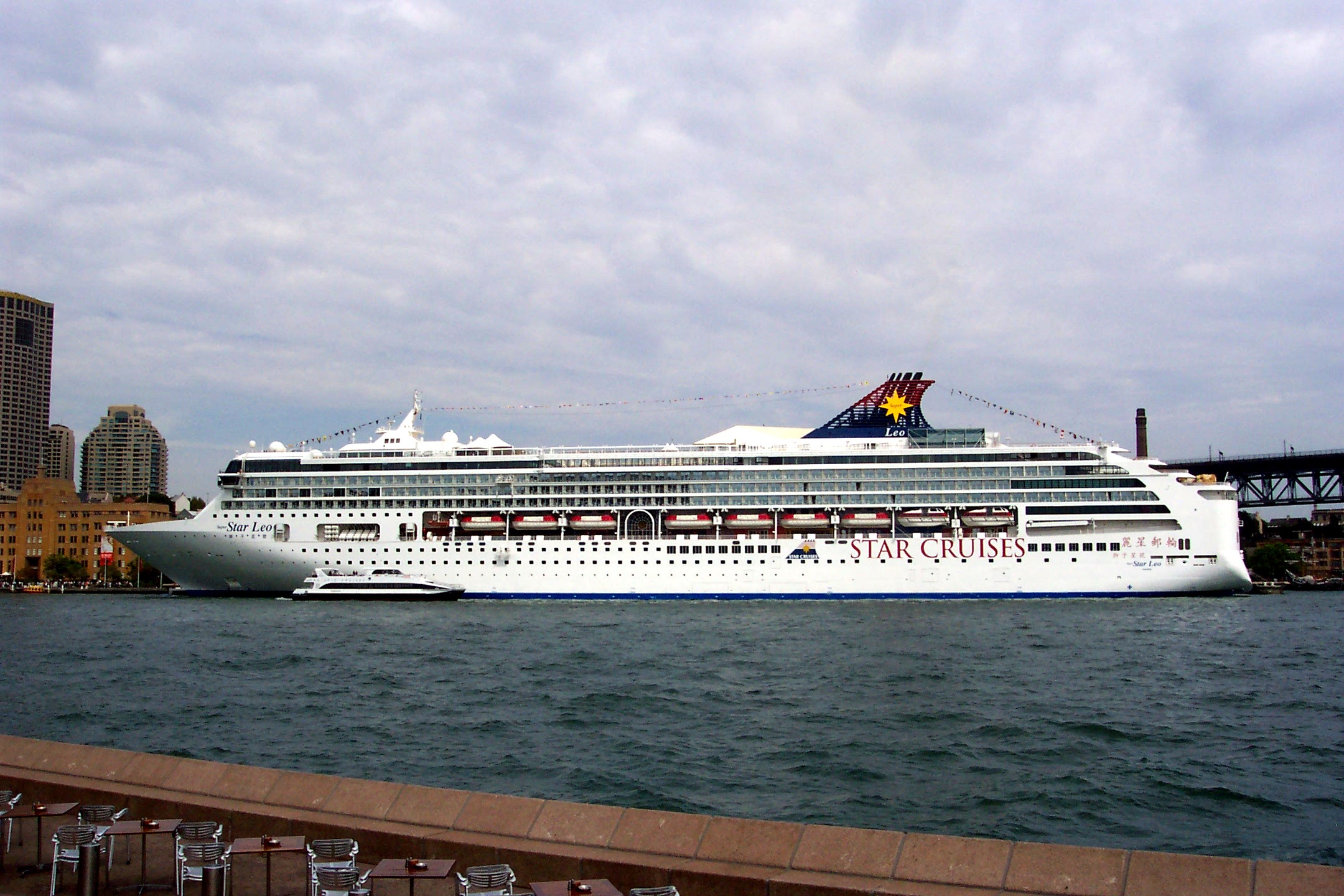
SuperStar Leo (now Norwegian Spirit), pictured in Sydney Harbour in 2004 was the first cruise ship of Star Cruises.

In 2001, Star Cruises founded a new sister company, Cruise Ferries, which began operating its sole ship, Wasa Queen, on short cruises from Hong Kong to Xiamen, followed by overnight gambling cruises from Hong Kong and gambling cruises from Port Klang in Kuala Lumpur. (Wasa Queen was sold in 2007.)

In 2004, SuperStar Leo was transferred to NCL. The ship then became Norwegian Spirit. It was rushed into service under the NCL America brand because Pride of America was not ready on time due to sinking at Lloyd Werft shipyard. (Since 2006, the trend was for new ships to be built for NCL, after which old ships in the NCL fleet were transferred to the Star Cruises fleet in Asia.)

In 2007, Star sold 50% of NCL to the Apollo Management group. In 2013, following a corporate reorganization and an initial public offering, NCL was made a wholly owned subsidiary of Norwegian Cruise Line Holdings. On 3 December 2018, Star and Apollo sold off their remaining stakes in Norwegian Cruise Line Holdings, marking the end of a relationship that had lasted more than a decade.

In early 2008, both NCL America and Orient Lines brands were discontinued, with the latter's sole ship, Marco Polo, sold to Greek interests. Also in that year, the first ship from NCL was transferred to the Star Cruises fleet as SuperStar Libra.

Starting from 2011, Star Cruises' ships received new hull art. One year later, it was announced on 27 April 2012 that Norwegian Dream would join the Star fleet, renamed as SuperStar Gemini, with service starting in 2012.

=== 2013–2018: New and renamed vessels ===
On 7 October 2013, Star Cruises announced they had entered into an agreement with Meyer Werft shipyard for the construction of one new cruise ship. The vessel would have capacity for 3,364 passengers at double occupancy. The ship would be delivered sometime in late 2016. Star Cruises then announced on 10 February 2014 that a second ship was ordered and would be delivered by late 2017. Both ships would have volumes of 150,000 GT.

On 9 February 2015, the first steel cutting ceremony for Genting World was held at Meyer Werft shipyard. In November 2015, it was announced that the vessels under construction would instead be delivered to Dream Cruises, with a new class of ships planned to be designed for Star Cruises.

In March 2018, Star Cruises announced that one of its ships, SuperStar Libra, would end her public cruise operations for the company on 27 June 2018. On 8 March 2018, Genting Hong Kong announced that the first global-class build previously allocated to Star Cruises would join the Dream Cruises fleet instead. On 11 September 2018, Genting Hong Kong also announced that SuperStar Virgo would move to Dream Cruises in April 2019 and be renamed the Explorer Dream. In November 2018, SuperStar Gemini returned to Malaysia for a six-month deployment.

=== 2022: Bankruptcy ===
In January 2022, the parent company of Star Cruises, Genting Hong Kong, declared bankruptcy due to the effects of the COVID-19 pandemic. In April, SuperStar Gemini, SuperStar Aquarius, and Star Pisces were all sold for scrap. Their smaller sister ship, The Taipan, was sold to OM Ships International in May 2022 and renamed Doulos Hope. Operation Mobilisation (OM) affiliate Gute Bücher für Alle accepted the ship in Penang, Malaysia on 25 May and completed her sea trial on 20 July. She then sailed to Singapore to continue a refurbishment which should have conclude by the end of 2023.

In September 2022, Thay, under the buyer name Resorts World, bought the trademarks for Star Cruises for around $3.5 million.

=== 2025: Revival as StarCruises ===
On 26 February 2025, Resorts World Cruises from Malaysia announced that the brand would split its operations, reforming Dream Cruises and Star Cruises as StarCruises. Genting Dream rejoined Dream Cruises, while Resorts World One rebranded into Star Navigator and will sail along side the Star Voyager.

== Fleet ==
=== Current fleet ===
Ships sailing under the reformed StarCruises
Ship	In service for StarCruises	Built	Gross Tonnage (GT)	Status as of 2026	Image
Star Voyager	2025	1997	77,441	Previously Pacific Explorer for P&O Cruises Australia Acquired by StarCruises in 2025.	
Star Navigator	2025	1999	75,338	Star Cruises second new build. Formerly named as SuperStar Virgo under Star Cruises.	

=== Former fleet ===
Ships that sailed as part of Star Cruises
Ship	In service for Star Cruises	Built	Gross Tonnage (GT)	Status as of 2026	Image
Star Aquarius	1993–2001	1988	40,012	Now Nordic Pearl for Destination Gotland.	
Star Pisces	1994–2022	1990	40,012	Previously Kalypso; scrapped at Alang in 2022.	
MegaStar Taurus	1994–2015	1989	3,341	Now National Geographic Islander II for Lindblad Expeditions.	
The Taipan	July 1994 – May 2022	1991	3,370	Entered service for Star Cruises as MegaStar Aries (1994–2012), then renamed Genting World (2012–2013) and The Taipan (2013–2022). Transferred to Operation Mobilisation as Doulos Hope in May 2022. Now serving as a floating library owned by the German faith-based German charity Gute Bücher für Alle.	
SuperStar Gemini	1995–2009	1992	19,093	Now Gemini for Miray Cruises.	
SuperStar Capricorn	1997–1998 2001–2004	1973	21,891	Previously Golden Princess. Scrapped at Aliağa, Turkey in 2021.	
SuperStar Europe; SuperStar Aries	1999–2000; 2000–2004	1980	37,301	Now Blue Sapphire for ANEX Tour.	
SuperStar Sagittarius	1998	1972	16,607	Previously Oriental Dragon. Scrapped at Gadani in 2022.	
SuperStar Leo	1998–2004	1998	75,338	Star Cruises first newly built. Now Norwegian Spirit for Norwegian Cruise Line.	
SuperStar Virgo	1999–2019	1999	75,338	Star Cruises second newly built. Transferred to Dream Cruises as Explorer Dream in April 2019. Returned to reformed StarCruises as Star Navigator in 2025.	
MegaStar Capricorn	2000–2001	1991	4,280	Now Blue Zephyr for Kalamata Shipping.	
MegaStar Sagittarius	2000–2001	1991	4,200	Now Sea Spirit for Poseidon Expeditions.	N/A
Norwegian Star 1	2001–2002	1973	4,200	Last sailed as Albatros for Phoenix Reisen; Scrapped at Alang in 2021.	
SuperStar Taurus	2000–2001	1980	15,179	Last sailed as Celestyal Crystal for Celestyal Cruises. Scrapped at Alang in 2025.	
SuperStar Libra	2005–2018	1988	42,275	Previously Norwegian Sea. Scrapped at Aliağa in 2022.	
SuperStar Aquarius	2007–2022	1993	51,309	Previously Norwegian Wind. Scrapped at Alang in 2022.	
SuperStar Gemini	2012–2022	1992	50,764	Previously Norwegian Dream. Scrapped at Alang in 2022.	

=== Cancelled ships ===
Ships that were ordered for Star Cruises but transferred before completion or never built:

Ship	Built	Year ship would enter Star Cruises services	Gross Tonnage	Status as of 2026	Image
SuperStar Libra	2001	2001	91,740	Transferred to Norwegian Cruise Line before completion as Norwegian Star.	
SuperStar Scorpio	2002	2002	92,250	Transferred to Norwegian Cruise Line before completion as Norwegian Dawn.	
N.N.	2003		112,000	Never built; Sagittarius class	
N.N.	2005		112,000	Never built; Sagittarius class	
Genting World	2016		150,695	Transferred to Dream Cruises before completion as Genting Dream.	
N.N.	2017		150,695	Transferred to Dream Cruises before completion as World Dream. Now sailing as Aroya for Aroya Cruises.	
N.N.	2019		208,000	Transferred to Dream Cruises before completion as Global Dream; acquired by the Disney Cruise Line as of November 2022 while still under construction with the new name Disney Adventure.	
N.N.	Scrapped		208,000	Transferred to Dream Cruises before completion. Second ship of the Global class. Incomplete lower hull scrapped.	
