= Genting Dream =

Cruise ship

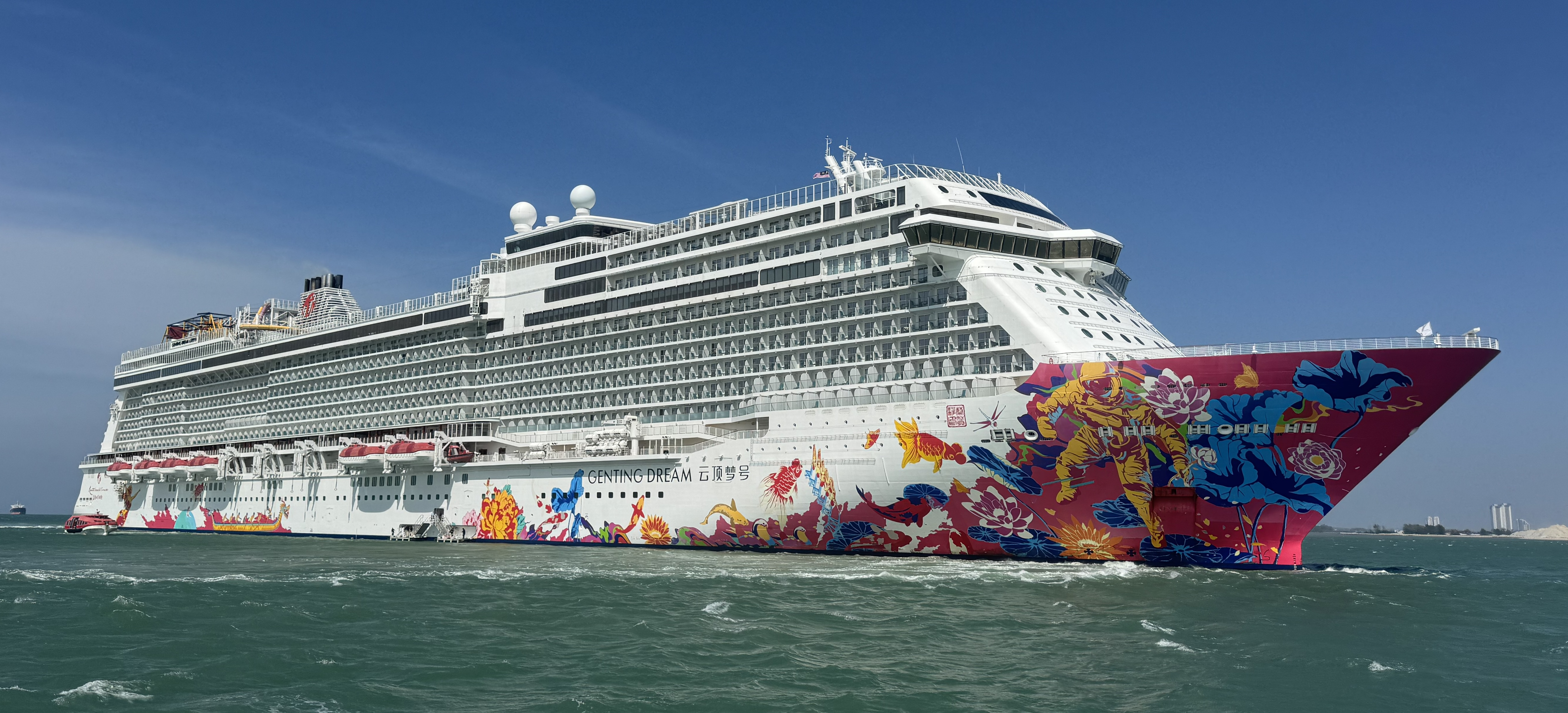
- Genting Dream in Malacca, Malaysia in February 2025

History
- Name: Genting Dream
- Owner: 2016–2020: Genting Hong Kong; 2020–present: Bank of Communications Financial Leasing Co., Ltd, CMB Financial Leasing Co., Ltd, CCB Financial Leasing Corporation Limited and China Development Bank Financial Leasing Co., Ltd
- Operator: 2016–2022: Dream Cruises; 2022–2025: Resorts World Cruises; May 2025: Dream Cruises
- Port of registry: Nassau, Bahamas
- Route: Singapore, Malaysia, Thailand, Indonesia, Vietnam, Brunei
- Builder: Meyer Werft
- Yard number: 711
- Laid down: 29 July 2015
- Launched: 19 August 2016
- Maiden voyage: 4 November 2016
- In service: 4 November 2016
- Identification: Call sign: C6BO5; IMO number: 9733105; MMSI number: 311000319; Classification Society: DNV-GL
- Status: In Service

General characteristics
- Class & type: Genting-Dream-class cruise ship
- Tonnage: 150,695 GT
- Length: 335.33 m (1,100 ft 2 in)
- Beam: 39.7 m (130 ft 3 in)
- Height: 61 m (200 ft)
- Draft: 8.3 m (27 ft 3 in)
- Decks: 18
- Installed power: Total installed power: 76,800 kW (103,000 hp)
- Propulsion: 3 bow thrusters, 2 azimuth thrusters
- Capacity: 3,352 passengers
- Crew: ~1,700

Genting Dream is a cruise ship of Dream Cruises. The ship has a length of 335.33 metres (1,100 ft 2 in), a width of 39.7 metres (130 ft 3 in), a size of 150,695 GT, and a top speed of over 23 knots (43 km/h; 26 mph).

The construction of Genting Dream, the first ship of the cruise brand, Dream Cruises, was completed on 12 October 2016, and the vessel sailed from Papenburg, Germany the next day. The ship was originally designed and ordered for StarCruises, but she was transferred to Dream Cruises during construction. After the liquidation of Dream Cruises parent company, Genting Hong Kong, the vessel was chartered to Resorts World Cruises.

== History ==
Genting Dream was ordered in October 2013 for Star Cruises. Construction began on 9 February 2015; the keel was laid a few months later. In November 2015, she was transferred to sister brand Dream Cruises as Genting Dream and on 19 August 2016 she was floated out of dry dock.

Genting Dream was christened in November 2016 in Guangzhou by Puan Sri Cecilia Lim, the wife of Genting CEO Lim Kok Thay. Following Dream Cruise's insolvency, the Genting Dream was transferred to Resorts World Cruises, operating under the same name.

On 25 February 2025, Resorts World Cruises announced that the brand would split its operations, reforming Dream Cruises and StarCruises as StarCruises, with Genting Dream becoming the first ship of the reformed Dream Cruises.

== Areas of operation ==
A positioning cruise was undertaken from Papenburg to Guangzhou in 2016. Subsequently, she has undertaken regional cruises from various Asian ports, such as the Marina Bay Cruise Centre Singapore.
