= Dream Cruises =

Cruise line

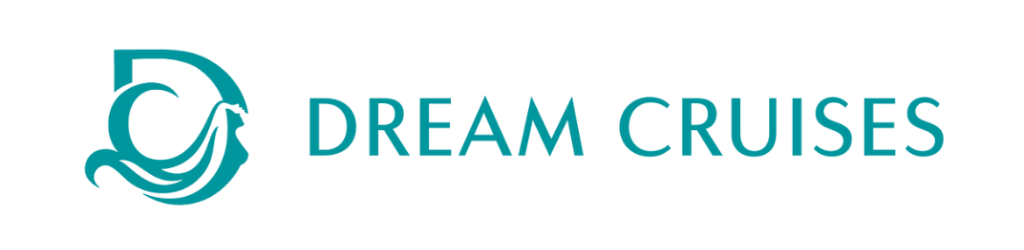
- Type: Public company
- Industry: Passenger transportation & Cruises
- Founded: 1 November 2015
- Headquarters: Malaysia, Asia
- Area served: Asia Pacific
- Key people: Tan Sri Lim Kok Thay, CEO & Chairman
- Services: Cruises
- Parent: StarDream Cruises
- Website: StarDreamCruises.com

Dream Cruises is a cruise line owned by the Malaysian company StarDream Cruises.

It was previously owned by Genting Hong Kong. Genting announced the introduction of Dream Cruises in November 2015 in Guangzhou as an Asian luxury cruise line. It debuted in November 2016. In October 2022, a court in Bermuda ordered the liquidation of Genting Hong Kong and Dream Cruises. Lim Kok Thay bought back the trademark of Genting Hong Kong brands.

On 26 February 2025, Lim Kok Thay Resorts World Cruises announced that the brand would split its operations, reforming Dream Cruises and Star Cruises as StarCruises. With the new reform, Genting Dream became the first ship of the reformed Dream Cruises.

== Fleet ==
=== Current fleet ===
Ship	Year built	Class	Entered service with Dream Cruises	Gross tonnage	Notes	Image
Genting Dream	2016	Genting	2016-2022, 2025-present	150,695	Originally ordered for Star Cruises. Transferred before completion to Dream Cruises as Genting Dream. Transferred to Resorts World Cruises in 2022. Rejoined the Dream Cruises fleet in 2025.	

=== Former fleet ===
Ship	Year built	Class	Entered service with Dream Cruises	Gross tonnage	Notes	Image
World Dream	2017	Genting	2017-2023	150,695	Originally ordered for Star Cruises. Transferred to Dream Cruises before completion as World Dream. Purchased by Public Investment Fund of Saudi Arabia in 2023 for US$ 330 million and renamed her Manara for Aroya Cruises. Now named as Aroya.	
Explorer Dream	1999	Leo	2019-2023	75,338	Formerly sailed as SuperStar Virgo for Star Cruises. Transferred to Resorts World Cruises in 2023. Transferred to StarCruises as Star Navigator in 2025.	

=== Cancelled fleet ===
Ship	Class	Gross tonnage	Notes	Image
Global Dream	Global	208,000	Originally ordered for Star Cruises. Construction started on 8 March 2018, before the keel was laid on 11 September 2018. Was to be home-ported in Shanghai. Incomplete ship was sold to Disney Cruise Line in November 2022. Disney has arranged to work with the shipbuilding companies LTH-Baas and Meyer Werft to complete the unfinished ship now renamed Disney Adventure, currently sailing as of March 2026.	
Global Dream II (interim name)	Global	208,000	Construction started on 10 September 2019, keel laid on 9 December 2019. Unfinished lower hull of ship sold for scrap in late 2022 after the cruise line's insolvency.	
