= Volkswerft =

German Baltic Sea shipyard

Coordinates: 54°18′03″N 13°06′27″E

Volkswerft (German: Volkswerft Stralsund GmbH) is a shipyard in the Hanseatic city of Stralsund on the Strelasund. It is part of the German Hegemann-group.

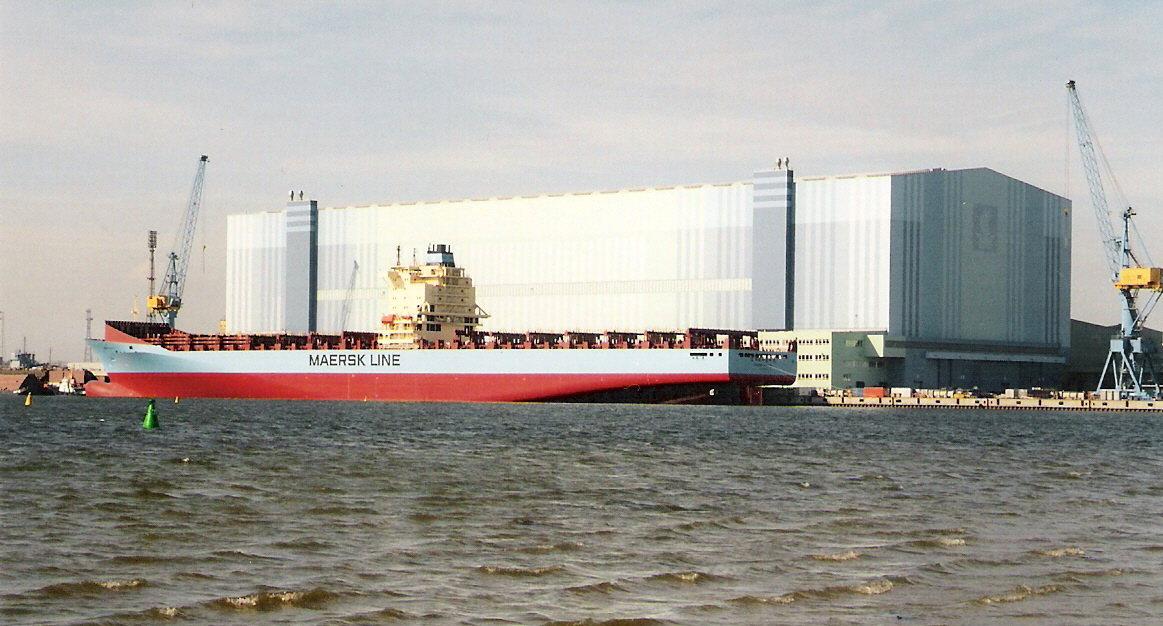
The Maersk Boston in port.

The Volkswerft was founded in 1948 as Ingenieurbau Ges.m.b.H.. On April 25 the first trawler was delivered and on June 15, 1948 the VEB Volkswerft Stralsund was registered.

From 1948 till 1953 the shipyard produced 196 ships, all of them to be used for reparation payments to the Soviet Union.

In the following years, the Volkswerft produced trawlers for the Soviet and other fleets. In October 1957, the first ship built for a fleet not pertaining to the Eastern Bloc was delivered to Iceland. In 1973, Lloyd's of London saw the Volkswerft as number one in the production of trawlers worldwide.

After 1990, the Volkswerft was privatized two times, first as Volkswerft Stralsund GmbH becoming part of the Vulkan-Gruppe (Bremen) in 1993. In 1998 it became part of the Maersk group, Maersk having paid 25 million DM to the Treuhand.

The yard is completely modernized by now, including a large shipbuilding hall and a 230 m (now 275 m length) ship lift to launch the ships. Container ships (2,500 class) are produced for the Mærsk fleet. They have a size of 2,900-3,000 TEU. Supply vessels and cable-laying vessels are also produced.

In 2016, the yard was purchased by Genting Hong Kong and folded into the newly formed MV Werften group with two other German shipbuilders. In 2022, the company filed for bankruptcy. Same year, the site was bought by the City of Stralsund. Since then, different companies are based at the former shipyard facilities. For example, the scrapping company Leviathan GmbH from Bremen is planning to scrap ships here.
