= Global-class cruise ship =

Class of German cruise ships

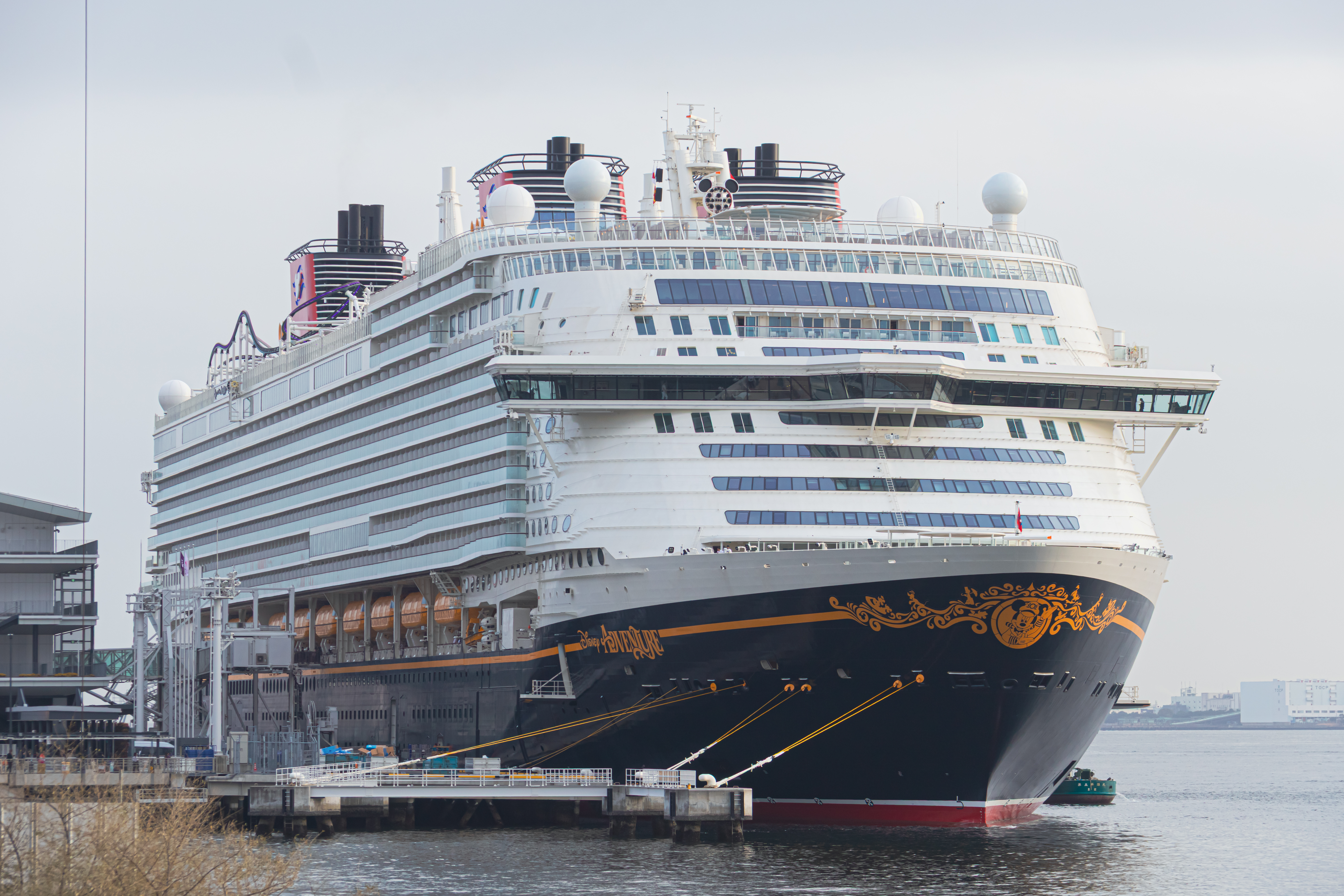
- Disney Adventure (formerly Global Dream) stopped at the Tokyo International Cruise Terminal in Japan, en route to Singapore.

Class overview
- Name: Global class
- Builders: MV Werften Wismar, Rostock, Stralsund; Meyer Wismar Klaipeda
- Operators: Dream Cruises (2018–2022, while under construction); Disney Cruise Line (2022–present)
- Preceded by: Dream Cruises: Genting class; Disney Cruise Line: Wish class
- Built: 2018–2025
- Planned: 2
- Building: 0
- Completed: 1
- Canceled: 1

General characteristics
- Type: Cruise ship
- Tonnage: 208,000 GT
- Length: 342 m (1,122 ft 1 in)
- Beam: 46.4 m (152 ft 3 in)
- Draft: 9.5 m (31 ft 2 in)
- Installed power: 96,000 kW (129,000 hp)
- Propulsion: 6 × MAN 48/60CR diesel engines; 3 × Azipod XO thrusters
- Capacity: 6,000-9,000 (approximate)
- Crew: 2,300 (post-Disney configuration)

The Global class is a class of cruise ships constructed by the German shipbuilder MV Werften for Genting Hong Kong. Originally a class of two ships, only one was completed, as Genting's bankruptcy in 2022 placed the future of the Global class in doubt. On November 16, 2022, Disney Cruise Line confirmed it acquired the unfinished Global Dream. The second, unfinished ship has been scrapped.

== History ==
Genting Hong Kong ordered two ships of the class in May 2016 from its subsidiary Lloyd Werft Group for service in the Star Cruises fleet, with delivery of the first vessel planned for 2019. In July 2016, Genting Hong Kong reorganized Lloyd Werft Group, resulting in the formation of MV Werften as a builder of large cruise ships; accordingly, the Global class order was transferred to Dream Cruises.

At the time they were ordered, the design of the ships had not been completed, and as a result construction did not begin until March 2018, when ceremonial steel cuttings for the first ship in the class were held at shipyards in Wismar and Rostock. Major components of the ships were constructed at both shipyards, with assembly taking place in Wismar. Construction was scheduled to take just under three years, with the first ship to be delivered in late 2020 and the second in late 2021.

In March 2018, Genting Hong Kong announced that the two planned Global-class ships would be operated by Dream Cruises upon delivery, sailing from Chinese ports during the summer season and further afield in Southeast Asia, Oceania and the west coast of the United States during the remainder of the year.

The construction of the first ship, Global Dream, started on 8 March 2018 at the facilities in Wismar and Rostock. The keel was laid on 11 September 2018 in Rostock. A big part of the ship left the drydock in Rostock on 22 November 2019 and was towed to Wismar, where it entered the drydock on 23 November 2019.

The construction of the second ship, unnamed but sometimes referred to as Global Dream II, started on 10 September 2019 in Rostock. The keel was laid in Rostock on 9 December 2019.

Due to the temporary closure of the shipyard in 2020 as a result of the COVID-19 pandemic, the delivery of both Global-class ships was expected to be delayed. The unfinished Global Dream II was cancelled in June 2022 after shipbuilder MV Werften filed for bankruptcy in January 2022, with the hull to be sold for scrap as the administrators could not find a buyer and the shipyard needs the space it occupies.

On November 16, 2022, Disney Cruise Line purchased the Global Dream for €40 million, a discount from the original value of €1.8 billion. Disney plans to work with the shipbuilding company Meyer Werft to complete the unfinished ship as Disney Adventure by 2025, working together with LTH-Baas from Estonia. On September 10, 2025, the maiden voyage for Disney Adventure was pushed back to March 10, 2026. The ship was delivered on 13 December 2025. It arrived in Singapore on March 3, 2026, and the maiden voyage took place a week after, on March 10.

== Design ==
Global-class ships were originally planned to measure 201,000 gross tonnage (GT), but were increased to 208,000 GT in the final design. They are 342 metres (1,122 ft 1 in) in length, with a beam of 46.4 metres (152 ft 3 in) and a draft of 9.5 metres (31 ft 2 in). They are powered by six MAN Diesel & Turbo 48/60CR diesel engines, which make a total of 96,000 kilowatts (129,000 hp) and power three ABB Azipod XO thrusters via ABB electrical generators. ABB also supplied major control components and software.

The ships were planned to use artificial intelligence and robots for many customer-facing services, with extensive use of voice and face recognition.

The pre-Disney design provided for 2,350 passenger cabins allowing for up to 9,000 passengers, 4,700 of those in lower berths. Her crew was to be approximately close to 2,200. Disney’s announcement of the acquisition stated that the ship is expected to have a maximum passenger capacity of about 6,000, along with a slightly improved crew complement of 2,300.

== Ships ==
Ship	In-service date	IMO-number	Gross Tonnage	Image	Newbuilding no.	Note
Disney Adventure (Note: Originally Global Dream)	March 10, 2026	9808986	208,108		125	Incomplete hull sold to Disney Cruise Line; construction completed by Meyer Werft.
Global Dream II (interim name)	-	9808998	208,000		126	Incomplete hull scrapped. Scrapping started in October 2022 and completed in December.

== See also ==
- List of largest cruise ships
