= Rick Bogart =

Rick Bogart may refer to:

- Rick Bogart (musician)
- Rick Bogart (racing driver)
