= Disney Adventure =

Cruise ship operated by Disney Cruise Line

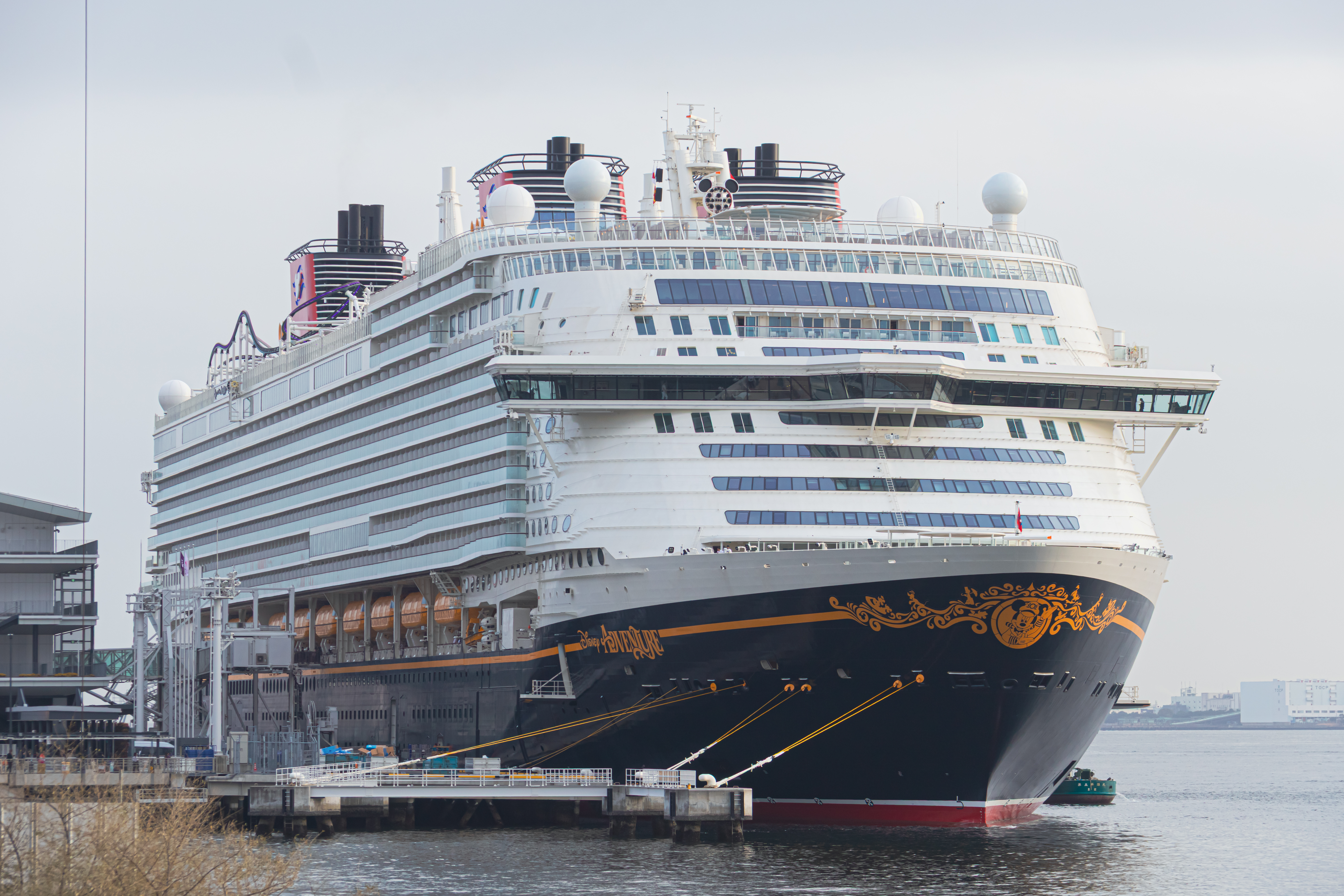
- Disney Adventure stopped at the Tokyo International Cruise Terminal, Japan, en route to Singapore, in February 2026.

History

Bahamas
- Name: Global Dream (2018–2022, during early construction); Disney Adventure (2022–present)
- Owner: The Walt Disney Company
- Operator: Disney Cruise Line
- Port of registry: Nassau, Bahamas
- Ordered: May 11, 2016
- Builder: MV Werften (Rostock, Germany); Meyer Wismar (Wismar, Germany) (Note: Construction started by MV Werften at the Rostock shipyard. After MV Werften's bankruptcy, construction was completed under the supervision of Meyer Werft at MV Werften's former shipyard in Wismar, which was bought by TKMS and leased to Meyer Werft.)
- Cost: Initial construction price: €1.6 billion; Purchase price: €40 million (Note: This is the price paid by Disney to the MV Werften insolvency administrator to transfer ownership of the partially finished hull.); Completion cost: US$1.8 billion
- Yard number: NB-125
- Laid down: September 11, 2018
- Launched: April 19, 2025
- Sponsored by: Robert Downey Jr.
- Christened: March 4, 2026
- Completed: December 12, 2025
- Acquired: November 16, 2022
- Maiden voyage: March 10, 2026
- In service: 2026-present
- Identification: IMO number: 9808986; MMSI number: 311000934; Call sign: C6EM2
- Status: In service

General characteristics
- Class & type: Global-class cruise ship
- Tonnage: 208,108 GT
- Length: 342.7 m (1,124.3 ft)
- Beam: 46.4 m (152.2 ft)
- Height: 70.67 m (231.9 ft)
- Draft: 9.5 m (31.2 ft)
- Decks: 19
- Installed power: 6 × MAN engines turning 16 MW (21,000 hp) generators
- Propulsion: 3 × ABB Azipod XO azimuth thrusters
- Speed: Service: 23 kn (43 km/h; 26 mph); Maximum: 24.3 kn (45.0 km/h; 28.0 mph)
- Capacity: 4,222 passengers (double occupancy); 6,700 passengers (maximum)
- Crew: 2,300
- Notes: Bow character: Captain Mickey; Atrium character: Snow White; Stern characters: Captain Mickey and Captain Minnie

Disney Adventure (originally named Global Dream) is a cruise ship owned and operated by Disney Cruise Line, a subsidiary of the Walt Disney Company. She is the eighth ship in the Disney Cruise Line fleet and the first and only current vessel of the Global class, with her originally planned sister ship canceled. At 208,108 gross tonnage (GT), Disney Adventure is one of the largest cruise ships in the world and the largest cruise ship ever built in Germany. She is also the first four-funnelled ocean-going passenger vessel since the retirement of the RMS Aquitania in 1950.

She is planned to operate year-round from Marina Bay Cruise Centre Singapore until at least early 2031, marking Disney Cruise Line's first ship to be based outside the United States. The itineraries feature a new concept for the company in which the ship itself is "both the journey and the destination," offering 3- and 4-night voyages entirely at sea with no port calls. However, on August 26th, 2026 (SGT time), Disney Cruise Line announced its first ever port call at Langkawi, Malaysia, on select sailings beginning from December 31st, 2026.

The vessel was originally ordered on May 11, 2016, by Genting Hong Kong for its Dream Cruises brand. Construction began with the keel laying on September 11, 2018, at the Rostock shipyard of MV Werften, a Genting subsidiary. Progress was slowed by the COVID-19 pandemic, which contributed to the financial collapse of MV Werften and Genting. Disney purchased the vessel in 2022, estimated to be 60–80 percent complete, for €40 million—far below its original €1 billion valuation. After the acquisition, completion was overseen by Meyer Werft at MV Werften's former shipyard in Wismar, leased from TKMS. The interior was fitted with a reduced passenger capacity compared with the original plan. The ship was launched on April 19, 2025, began sea trials in September 2025, and was completed on December 12, 2025. Her maiden voyage took place on March 10, 2026.

Disney Adventure has a passenger capacity of approximately 6,700 and a gross tonnage of 208,108, making her 45% larger than the previous largest Wish-class ships. She measures 342.7 meters (1,124 ft) in length, 46.4 meters (152 ft) in width, and is four decks taller than the Wish-class vessels, with 1,954 staterooms. The ship is split into different neighbourhoods: Imagination Garden, Town Square, San Fransokyo Street, Marvel Landing, Discovery Reef, Wayfinder Bay and Toy Story Place. The ship is designed to use lower-emission methanol fuel, though as of 2026 green methanol is not yet widely available in Singapore, and is equipped with azimuthing podded propulsion (Azipod).

== History ==
=== Construction of the Global class ===
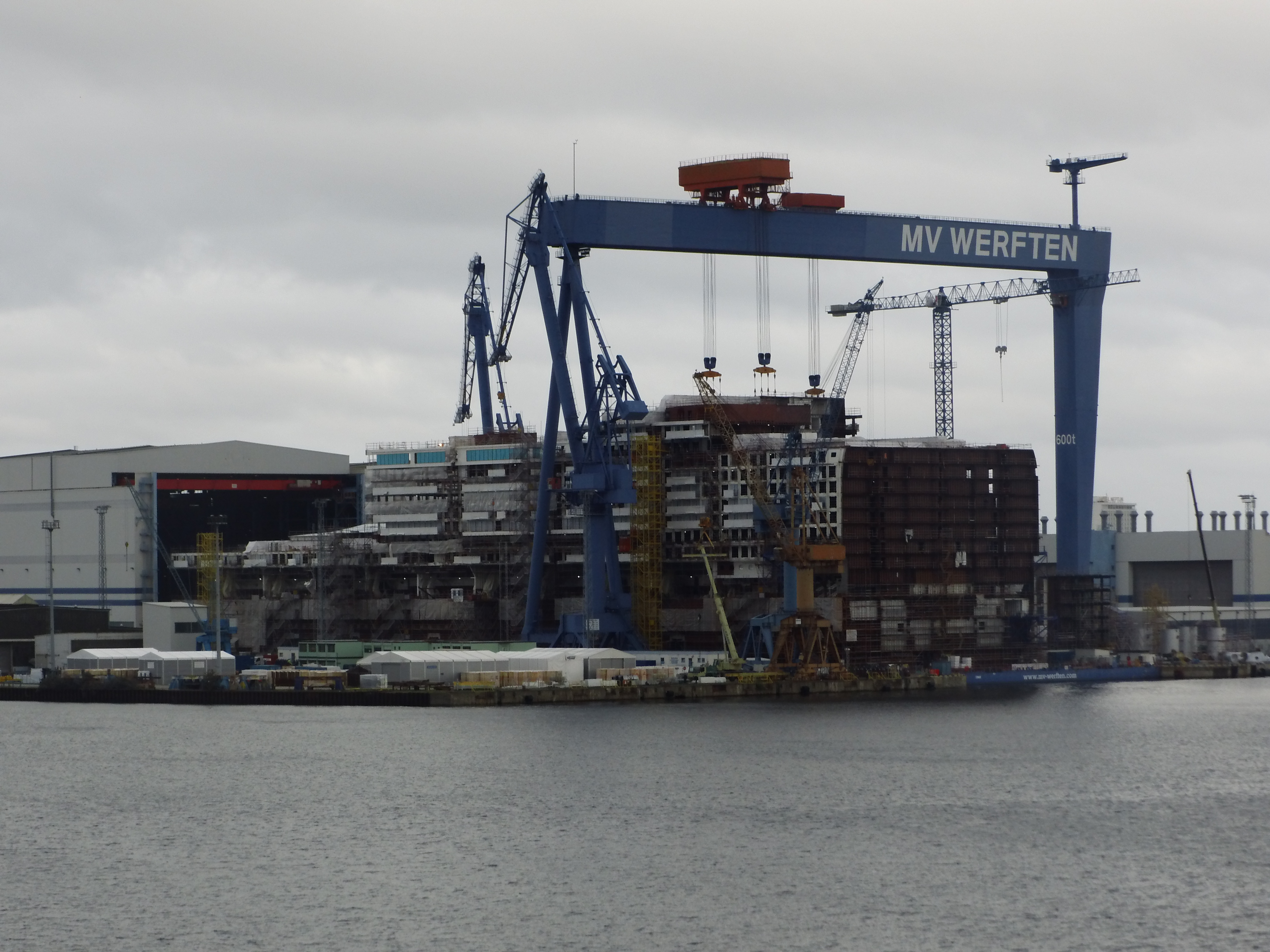
Disney Adventure (then known as Global Dream) under construction at the MV Werften Rostock shipyard in September 2019.

Genting Hong Kong ordered two Global class ships in May 2016 from its subsidiary Lloyd Werft for service with Star Cruises, with delivery of the first vessel planned for 2019. In July 2016, Genting reorganized Lloyd Werft, creating MV Werften as a builder of large cruise ships. In March 2018, Genting announced that the ships would instead be transferred to Dream Cruises, operating from Chinese ports in summer and sailing to Southeast Asia, Oceania, and the west coast of the United States during the remainder of the year.

Because the design was not yet complete at the time of ordering, construction did not begin until March 8, 2018, when ceremonial steel cuttings were held at MV Werften's shipyards in Wismar and Rostock. Work on the first ship, Global Dream, formally began that day. The keel was laid on September 11, 2018, in Rostock. Major components were built at both yards, with final assembly taking place in Wismar. A large hull section was floated out of the Rostock dry dock on November 22, 2019, and towed to Wismar, where it entered the dry dock the following day.

Construction was scheduled to take just under three years, with the first ship to be delivered in late 2020 and the second in late 2021.

=== Purchase by Disney and naming ===
Due to the temporary closure of the shipyard in 2020 as a result of the COVID-19 pandemic, delivery of both Global-class ships was expected to be delayed.

The pandemic's impact on tourism contributed to the collapse of Genting Hong Kong. MV Werften, Genting's German shipbuilding subsidiary, sought financial support from the German government to keep the shipyards operating but was unsuccessful. Hours after talks broke down, the company filed for bankruptcy on January 19, 2022.

On November 16, 2022, the insolvency administrator sold the first, partially completed ship, Global Dream, to Disney Cruise Line for €40 million. The second, less complete vessel was sold for scrap. The Wismar shipyard itself was acquired by TKMS (ThyssenKrupp Marine Systems), with provisions allowing Disney Cruise Line's longtime shipbuilding partner, Meyer Werft, to lease the facilities in order to complete the vessel.

At the time of the acquisition, Disney estimated that completing the ship would cost approximately US$1 billion, less than half the cost typically associated with constructing a new cruise ship. During the redesign process, Disney Imagineers substantially reworked the vessel to better align it with the company's family-oriented cruise model. Passenger accommodations were reduced to 2,111 cabins, with a maximum capacity of approximately 6,000 passengers, in order to improve the passenger-to-crew service ratio. The conversion proved more complex than initially anticipated, as the original design had been optimized for gambling-oriented cruise operations. Beginning in 2023, extensive structural modifications were undertaken, including the removal and relocation of internal steel supports, significant expansion of galley facilities, enlargement of entertainment venues, and the addition of multiple themed dining experiences.

Disney's final cost for the vessel is estimated at US$1.8 billion, which remains about 10 percent less than the cost of constructing a newly built Disney cruise ship. According to the company, converting the existing hull also reduced the overall project timeline by several years compared with building a vessel from the keel up.

Disney worked in collaboration with Meyer Werft to complete the vessel ahead of entry into service in 2026. The vessel will be the largest ship in the Disney Cruise Line fleet and the first to be homeported year-round outside the United States, operating from Singapore. On September 8, 2023, the ship was officially announced as the Disney Adventure at the Destination D23 Expo. Interior design work was carried out by Estonia-based firm LTH-Baas.

Construction was originally scheduled to be completed in May 2025, with a maiden voyage planned for December 15, 2025. The ship was floated out on April 19, 2025, and departed Wismar for sea trials on September 1. However, on September 10, 2025, Disney Cruise Line announced that the maiden voyage had been postponed to March 10, 2026.

The ship was delivered to Disney Cruise Line on December 13, 2025. It left Bremerhaven on January 4, 2026, with stops made in Port Canaveral, Florida, Los Angeles, California, and Tokyo, Japan. On February 2, 2026, the Panama Canal Authority announced that the ship is the largest by gross tonnage and passenger capacity Neopanamax cruise ship to cross the Panama Canal, breaking the previous record held by Norwegian Bliss.

Disney Adventure arrived at the Marina Bay Cruise Centre in Singapore on March 3, 2026, to a water salute and fireworks. It was officially christened by godparent Robert Downey Jr. in a ceremony the following night, on March 4. On March 10, 2026, Disney Adventure entered service and embarked on her maiden voyage, sailing on a three-night cruise from Singapore and back.

Beginning on December 31, 2026, select four-night cruises aboard the Disney Adventure will include a port stop at Langkawi, Malaysia. The sailings with the port call will start with two days at sea, with the Langkawi stop scheduled for the third day, and the fourth day being final day and night at sea.

== Design ==
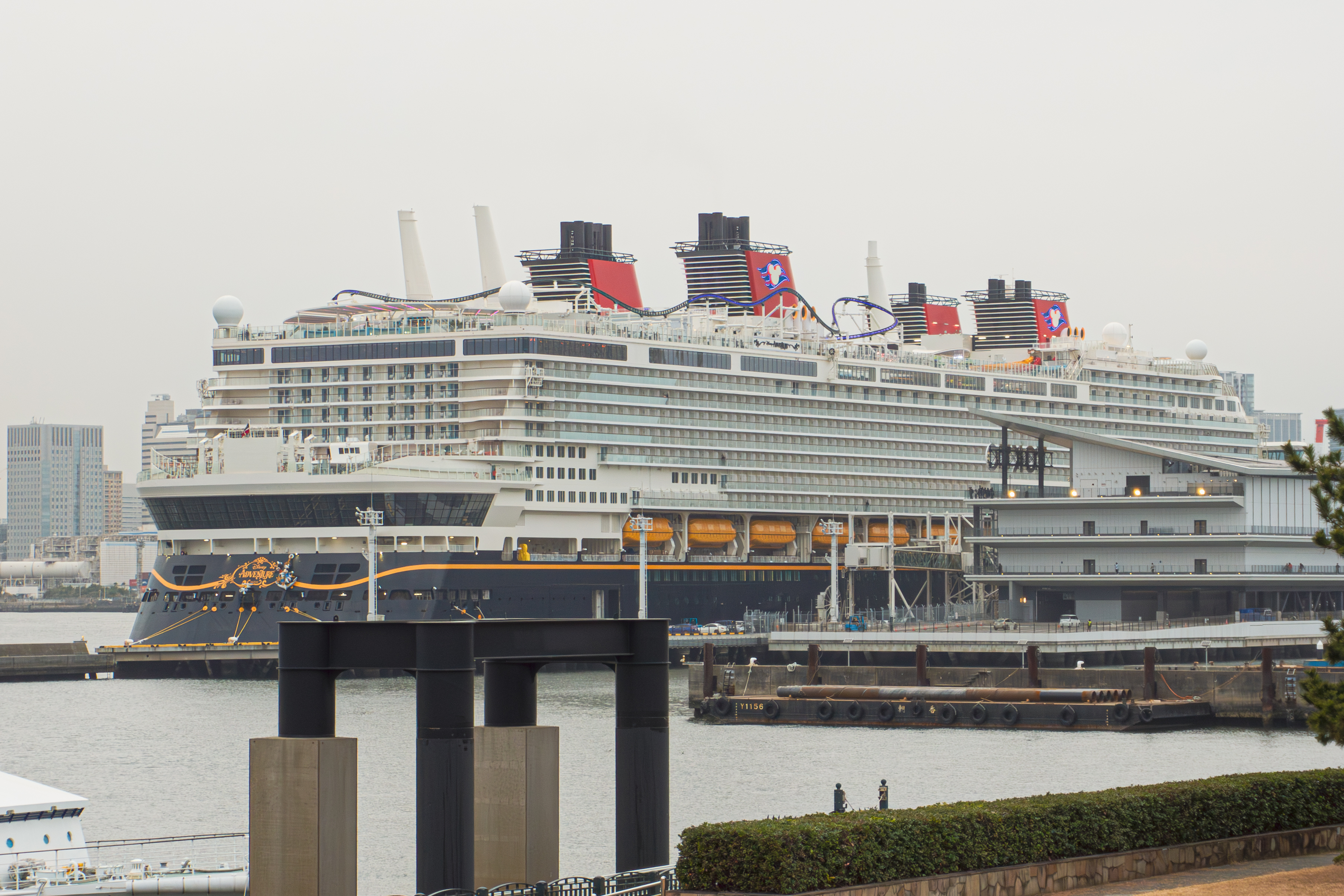
Stern view of the Disney Adventure, showing her four funnels.

The ship was originally planned at 201,000 gross tonnage (GT), and the final design measured over 208,000 GT. She measures 342 meters (1,122 ft 1 in) in length, with a beam of 46.4 meters (152 ft 3 in) and a draft of 9.5 meters (31 ft 2 in).

Propulsion is provided by six MAN 48/60CR engines with a combined output of 96,000 kilowatts (129,000 hp). The engines generate power for three Azipod XO thrusters through ACS6080 variable frequency drives, all built by ABB. ABB also supplied control components and software.

Disney Adventure was designed to operate on methanol fuel. However, green methanol was not available in Singapore at the time the ship entered service. The vessel instead operates on a mix of sustainable and lower-emission fuels, including hydrotreated vegetable oil (HVO).

The vessel has four funnels, the first Disney ship to have more than two. It is the first ocean-going passenger vessel built with four funnels since RMS Aquitania, which operated from 1914 to 1950. As with earlier Disney ships, not all funnels are functional, and the vessel's two forward funnels are dummy funnels. As such, it is also the first four-funnel passenger vessel with dummy funnels since RMS Windsor Castle and RMS Arundel Castle, which carried four funnels until 1937.

The original Global-class design was to incorporate artificial intelligence systems and robotic technologies for passenger services, including voice and facial recognition. That design provided for 2,350 passenger cabins with capacity for 9,000 passengers, including 4,700 in lower berths, and a crew of 2,200. Under Disney, the design was revised to include 2,111 passenger cabins with capacity for 6,000 passengers.

== Recreation ==
=== On-board activities ===
The ship features seven themed areas, conceptually similar to lands at Disney theme parks: Disney Discovery Reef, Toy Story Place, Wayfinder Bay, Marvel Landing, San Fransokyo Street, Town Square, and Disney Imagination Garden.

Disney Imagination Garden includes the Storybook Castle, described by the company as its first physical Disney castle created as an art installation aboard a ship. The structure rises three decks and is styled to resemble a pop-up storybook.

Marvel Landing includes the Ironcycle Test Run, designed by Maurer AG and described as Disney's first roller coaster at sea. At the time of the ship's launch, it was reported to be the longest roller coaster at sea, extending more than 820 feet (250 m). The area also includes two additional rides with lower height requirements: Pym Quantum Racers and Groot Galaxy Spin.

Disney Adventure is the first ship since the Disney Wonder that does not have an AquaDuck (or AquaMouse on the Wish-class) water slide. Instead, Woody and Jessie's Wild Slides, a pair of water slides located at Toy Story Place, stand in place of the AquaDuck.

On the second night of the Disney Adventure cruise, guests will be able to watch a fireworks show: "The Lion King: Celebration in the Sky", narrated by Shah Rukh Khan. This makes Disney Cruise Line the only cruise line in the world to offer fireworks at sea; the other ships in the Disney Cruise Line fleet also feature fireworks shows. Disney has this exclusive entertainment feature because they use biodegradable compressed air fireworks, which are completely harmless to the marine environment.

=== Entertainment ===
Disney Adventure contains the following entertainment venues:

- Garden Theatre (live original productions: Avengers Assemble!, Let's Set Sail, Duffy and The Friend Ship and Baymax Super Exercise Expo)
- Wayfinder Bay (live original production: Moana: Call of the Sea)
- Walt Disney Theatre (live original productions: Remember and Disney Seas the Adventure)
- Baymax Cinemas (screens motion pictures)

=== Dining ===
Every night of a Disney Adventure cruise, guests dine at a different restaurant. This is called "rotational dining". On a Disney ship, guests rotate along with their servers, which helps develop the relationship between diner and wait staff.

There are six rotational dining restaurants on the Disney Adventure:

- Hollywood Spotlight Club (deck 8 aft)
- Navigator's Club (deck 6 aft)
- Animator's Palate (deck 5 aft, also featured on four of the other Disney cruise ships)
- Animator's Table (deck 9 aft)
- Enchanted Summer Restaurant (deck 6 midship)
- Pixar Market Restaurant (deck 17 aft)

Because each voyage only lasts three to four nights, it is not possible to visit all six restaurants in one sailing. Thus, the rotational dining on the Disney Adventure is divided into three districts, with two restaurants per district, and guests are randomly assigned to one restaurant in each district. In addition, unlike other Disney Cruise Line ships, the Disney Adventure does not have its own buffet location. Therefore, the Enchanted Summer and Pixar Market restaurants function as buffets during breakfast and lunch. Two premium dining restaurants are available at an additional cost: Mike and Sulley's Flavors of Asia (deck 10 aft) and Palo Trattoria (decks 10 and 11 aft), the latter which is exclusively for adults.
