= Rick Bogart (musician) =

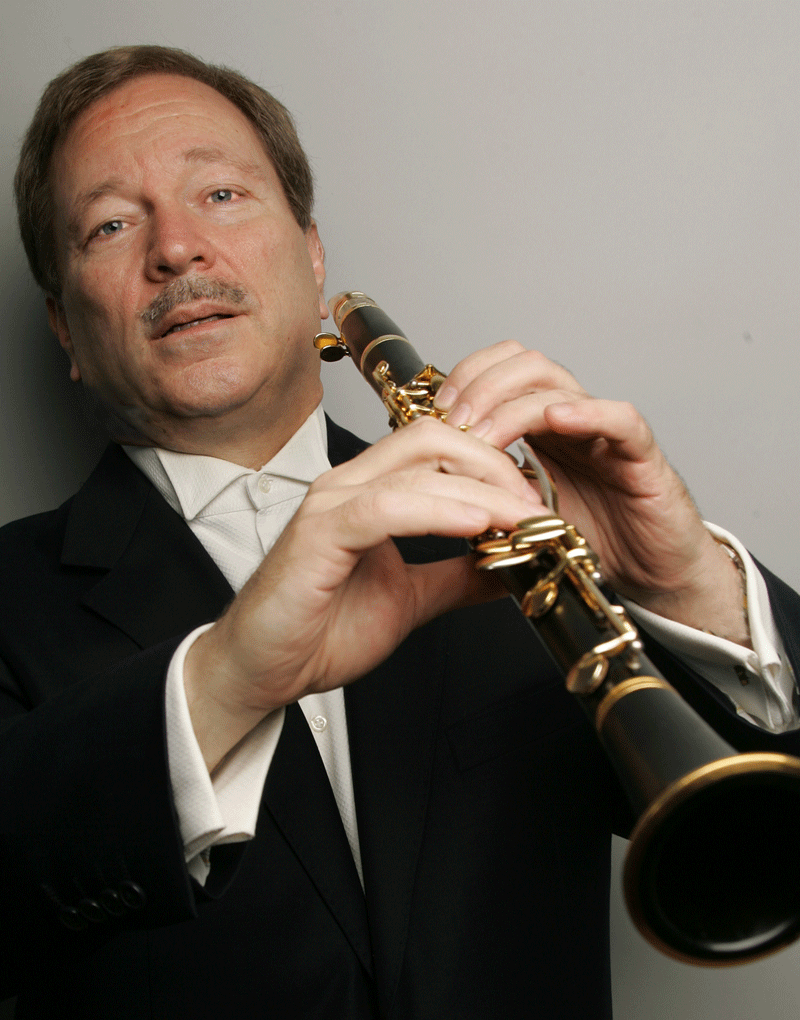
- Rick Bogart, New York, 1998

Background information
- Born: Rick Bogart; New Orleans, Louisiana, United States
- Genres: Jazz, swing, classical
- Occupations: Clarinetist, pianist, voice, composer
- Instruments: Clarinet, piano, voice
- Years active: 1970–present
- Labels: Arabesque Records, Jazzology
- Website: rickbogart.net

Rick Bogart is a jazz musician. Early in his career he played clarinet and piano, but he eventually focused solely on clarinet and later added vocals. He also composed throughout his career for clarinet.

Rick Bogart worked in New Orleans during the "heyday" of the French Quarter during the mid-1970s within the first five blocks of Bourbon Street. At that time, there were fifteen full-time Jazz bands along those blocks. During this time he played in the bands of Snookum Russell and Wallace Davenport at the Paddock Lounge, and with June Gardner, Nick Gagliardi, Milton Ziedrich and Thomas Jefferson at the Famous Door.

Bogart later moved to New York City to refine and broaden his style. He played in Atlantic City, Cleveland, New York City, Miami, and touring the world headlining on cruise ships for decades. He has written songs for major movies produced for HBO and is the subject of the documentary When the Clarinet Swings.

He is most closely aligned with his New Orleans and Swing-style background. However, he has broadened his style over the course of his career by living and working in New York, and working with many musicians of varying styles around the world.

== Early life ==
Rick Bogart was born to Carlos Hernàndez (from Madrid, Spain) and mother Audrey Bogart McBride on February 10, 1951. Rick Bogart's father changed his last name to Hardeman upon immigration to the United States, thus Rick Bogart was born Charles Richard Hernàndez Hardeman. He later changed his name to Rick Bogart (which was his mother's maiden name). His mother was herself an artist, clarinetist, and singer. Rick began piano studies at the age of 8, and clarinet at age 11. His clarinet studies were first with a retired big band musician, "Mr. Reader." According to Bogart, He had the distinct honor of meeting and having a private session with Jazz clarinetist Pete Fountain. Fountain let him play his clarinet and gave Rick Bogart advice about playing the clarinet. He attended Philadelphia's Curtis Institute of Music's High School Preparatory School, studying classical piano and clarinet. He went on to graduate from North Texas State University with his Bachelor of Music with a concentration in piano, clarinet (with Leon Russianoff, Kalmen Opperman, Gervase dePeyer), and voice (with Eugene Conley of the Metropolitan Opera).

== Career ==
Directly out of school, Bogart became the youngest union musician to lead a band at the Famous Door in New Orleans, a popular jazz club on Bourbon Street. He would lead a band called "The Basin Street Five" for a year and continued to perform at the Famous Door from 1976 to 1980. With Thomas Jefferson, Bogart played during the day-time slot at the Famous Door from noon to five, six days a week, for 14 months. Jefferson's music greatly influenced Bogart, especially his singing, and the latter developed an appreciation for musicians who could sing and play an instrument. He also played alongside Snookum Russell, Wallace Davenport, June Gardner, Nick Gagliardi, Milton Ziedrich, and occasionally Al Hirt. In 1975, he began voice study with Louis Panzeri, who had a voice studio on Bourbon Street. He was a noted voice teacher and singer in New Orleans.

He decided to move to New York in December 1980. Concurrently, he was offered a long-term contract to play at the Theatrical Grill in Cleveland, Ohio. He therefore began commuting for months at a time to Cleveland. It was there that he was discovered by Public Relations Executive Ron Watt who scheduled a number of television spots on the NBC affiliate station. He auditioned for Blake Cumbers, entertainment director at Atlantic City's Harrah's Casino in 1983 and was hired to headline on the spot. He would play there 18–24 weeks a year from 1983 to 1994.

After the entertainment industry changed in Atlantic City, Bogart began teaching English at Park West High School in Hell's Kitchen, Manhattan from 1997 to 99. At the time Hell's Kitchen was a notoriously dangerous neighborhood and the school was restructuring. While teaching, he continued to play locally in New York City, but held his steady job for two years as a teacher. This momentary side-step from his music career was quickly recovered when he began attracting attention from the agency of Bramson Entertainment. Bramson Entertainment connected him with several major cruise ships and landed him a headliner position on Holland America, Renaissance Cruises, Crystal Harmony, Crystal Symphony, and the Asuka. He went on to perform as a headliner on cruise ships from 1999 to 2011, performing 2 one-hour shows a week in over 72 countries. He was approached by manager Gerrard W. Purcell known as "Jerry Purcell", who decided to take on Bogart. Jerry Purcell discovered such well-known artists as Al Hirt, Maya Angelou, Eddy Arnold, and Jay Leno. Jerry Purcell helped Bogart achieve his goal of composing songs, culminating in Bogart's recording of Jazz Ballet for Solo Clarinet written by Bogart and produced by Arabesque Records. Bogart has a CD on the New Orleans Record Company, entitled Rick Bogart. He maintains a long-standing contract with Arabesque Records in New York since 2008.

Bogart also recorded music for films including the 1999 made for HBO TV movie Earthly Possessions and Love in the Time of Money. Bogart was the feature of a documentary produced by Jim Markovic entitled When the clarinet swings, which is played in television markets worldwide. He was also featured in the documentary entitled Sandy Jordan's World of Jazz and Cabaret. Bogart was featured in the 2013 documentary Mr. Jazz: Louis Armstrong by Italian filmmaker Michele Cinque, produced by MRF5 in collaboration with Louis Armstrong House Archive in New York.

Bogart began collaborating with the Amy Winehouse Foundation and Amy Winehouse's father Mitch Winehouse. Mitch Winehouse makes regular appearances with the Rick Bogart Trio in New York, and Bogart also performs with that same trio. Bogart performed for the University of Donetsk, in Ukraine, and the Kyiv Opera House sponsored by the AMS Corporation. Bogart was the featured performer of a major charity event in December 2010 for Arts and Tourism at the Plaza Hotel. The event was sponsored by NYC & Company and George Fertitta and co-chairman Mayor Michael R. Bloomberg honoring Terry Lundgren, Diane von Furstenberg, and Anna Wintour. Additionally, he has performed at a concert at the headquarters of the United Nations, with a special question & answer session with the U.N. Society Jazz Band.

== Discography ==
=== Solo ===
- 2005: Rick Bogart (Jazzology)
- 2007: Rick Bogart (Arabesque)
- 2008: New York Rhythm (Arabesque)
- 2011: Jazz Ballet for Clarinet (Arabesque)
- 2014: My Dog Loves Your Dog [Arabesque)
