= Crystal Serenity =

Cruise ship built in 2003

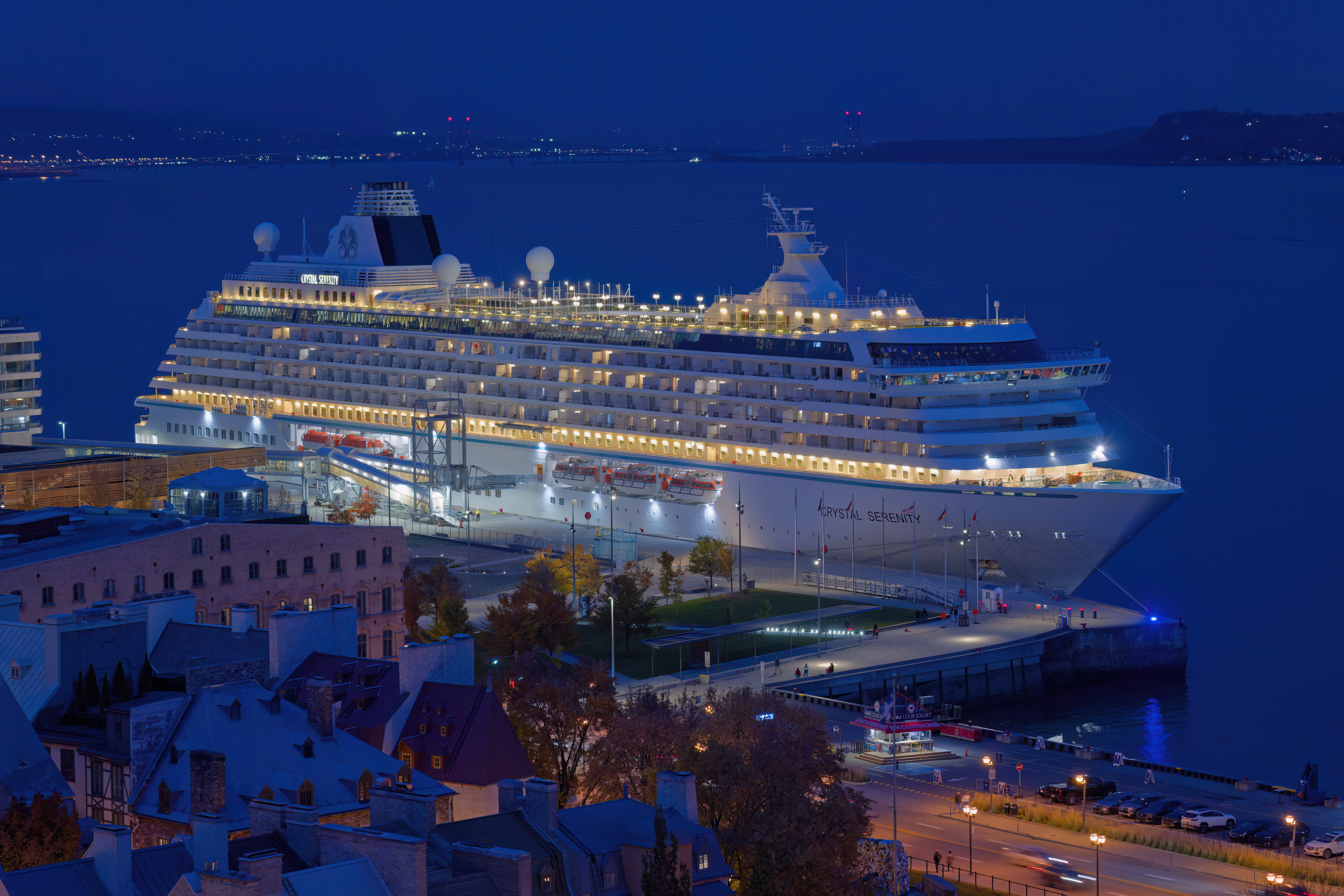
- Crystal Serenity in Quebec City

History
- Name: Crystal Serenity
- Owner: Genting Hong Kong (2003-2022); A&K Travel Group Ltd (2022-present)
- Operator: Crystal Cruises (2003-present)
- Port of registry: Nassau, Bahamas
- Ordered: 7 November 2000
- Builder: Chantiers de l'Atlantique, St. Nazaire, France
- Cost: US$350 million
- Laid down: 13 June 2002
- Launched: 10 August 2002
- Christened: 3 July 2003 by Dame Julie Andrews
- Completed: 30 June 2003
- Maiden voyage: 7 July 2003
- In service: 7 July 2003
- Identification: Call sign: C6SY3; IMO number: 9243667; MMSI number: 311536000

General characteristics
- Type: Cruise ship
- Tonnage: 68,870 GT; 34,913 NT
- Length: 250 m (820 ft)
- Beam: 32.2 m (106 ft)
- Draught: 8 m (26 ft)
- Decks: 13 decks; 9 decks passenger accessible
- Ice class: 1C
- Installed power: 6 × Wärtsilä 12V38B (6 × 8,700 kW)
- Propulsion: Diesel-electric; two Rolls-Royce Mermaid propulsion units (2 × 13,500 kW)
- Speed: 21 knots (39 km/h; 24 mph) (service); 22 knots (41 km/h; 25 mph) (maximum)
- Capacity: 1,040 passengers
- Crew: 655

Crystal Serenity is a cruise ship owned by Crystal Cruises. Crystal Serenity was built in 2003 by Chantiers de l'Atlantique in St. Nazaire. She operated together with her older fleetmate, Crystal Symphony, offering around the world voyages.

== Concept and construction ==
Crystal Serenity was ordered from Chantiers de l'Atlantique on 7 November 2000. The keel of Crystal Serenity was laid on 13 June 2002 and she was launched on 10 August 2002 being completed on 30 June 2003. She was formally named on 3 July 2003, by Dame Julie Andrews, in Southampton, United Kingdom.

The lead designer of Crystal Serenity was Robert Tillberg of Tillberg Design. The other designers were the Italian Garroni Designers Company, Japanese Okada & Associates, American Nix Firestone Associates and II by IV design Associates, British Stephenjohn Design and was internally designed by Brennan Beer Gorman Monk (BBGM) of New York.

In November 2018 she emerged from an extensive redesign at Lloyd Werft Bremerhaven.

== Mama Lee Wachtstetter ==
Passenger Lee Wachtstetter, known as "Mama Lee", 88 years old in 2016, lived aboard the Crystal Serenity full-time. She was the longest permanent luxury cruise ship resident. In 2018, she reached 10 years living aboard the ship. She spent about US$170k a year to live on the ship full-time.

== Ports of call ==
The maiden voyage of Crystal Serenity was on 7 July 2003, 4 days after her christening. It was a 14-day round-trip cruise, departing Southampton and cruising Northern Europe. During her inaugural season, Crystal Serenity held summer cruises in Europe, the Mediterranean Sea, and a transatlantic crossing. It was followed by two Caribbean/Panama Canal voyages and a combined Christmas/New Year Mexican Riviera cruise, round-trip from Los Angeles.

On 14 January 2004, she embarked on her first world cruise; a 106-day voyage departing Los Angeles, which concluded on 5 May, in New York City.

Crystal Serenity was the largest cruise ship ever to navigate the Northwest Passage. Starting on 10 August 2016, the ship sailed from Vancouver to New York City with 1,700 passengers and crew, taking 28 days for the journey. In the Canadian Arctic she made stops at Ulukhaktok and Cambridge Bay on Victoria Island, then passed up Franklin Strait and through the narrow Bellot Strait, adjacent to Zenith Point, the most northerly extension of North America. It explored Beechy Island where Franklin overwintered, followed by seldom visited fjords on the south side of Devon Island, plus fjords on Baffin Island and the village of Pond Inlet. On 5 September 2016 it sailed for Disko Bay in Greenland. Her transit triggered comments on Canada's Arctic sovereignty.

On 27 November 2021, Crystal Serenity was the first large cruise ship to exceed the size limits set by the citizens of Key West in November 2020.

== Arrest ==
In January 2022, a warrant was issued for the arrest of the ship should she reenter US waters. On 4 February 2022, both Crystal Serenity and her sister, Crystal Symphony were arrested while in Bahamian waters. The total amount owed for fuel was reported to be about $4.6 million.

== Refurbishment and relaunch ==
In June 2022, she was sold at auction to CSE Ltd., reported to be a shell corporation for the actual buyer, for $103 million.

In July 2022, the ship underwent refurbishment in Trieste, Italy. After completion, the ship re-entered service on 31 July 2023.

As part of the relaunch under new ownership, Crystal announced that Russ Grieve, previously the Cruise Director aboard Crystal Symphony, would join Crystal Serenity in the same role. Grieve, known for his extensive Broadway background including a lengthy run in Mamma Mia!, brought with him over seven years of experience aboard Symphony.

== Media ==
Crystal Serenity was the subject of Mighty Ships season 6, episode 3, first broadcast 2012.
