= National Geographic Islander II =

German cruise ship

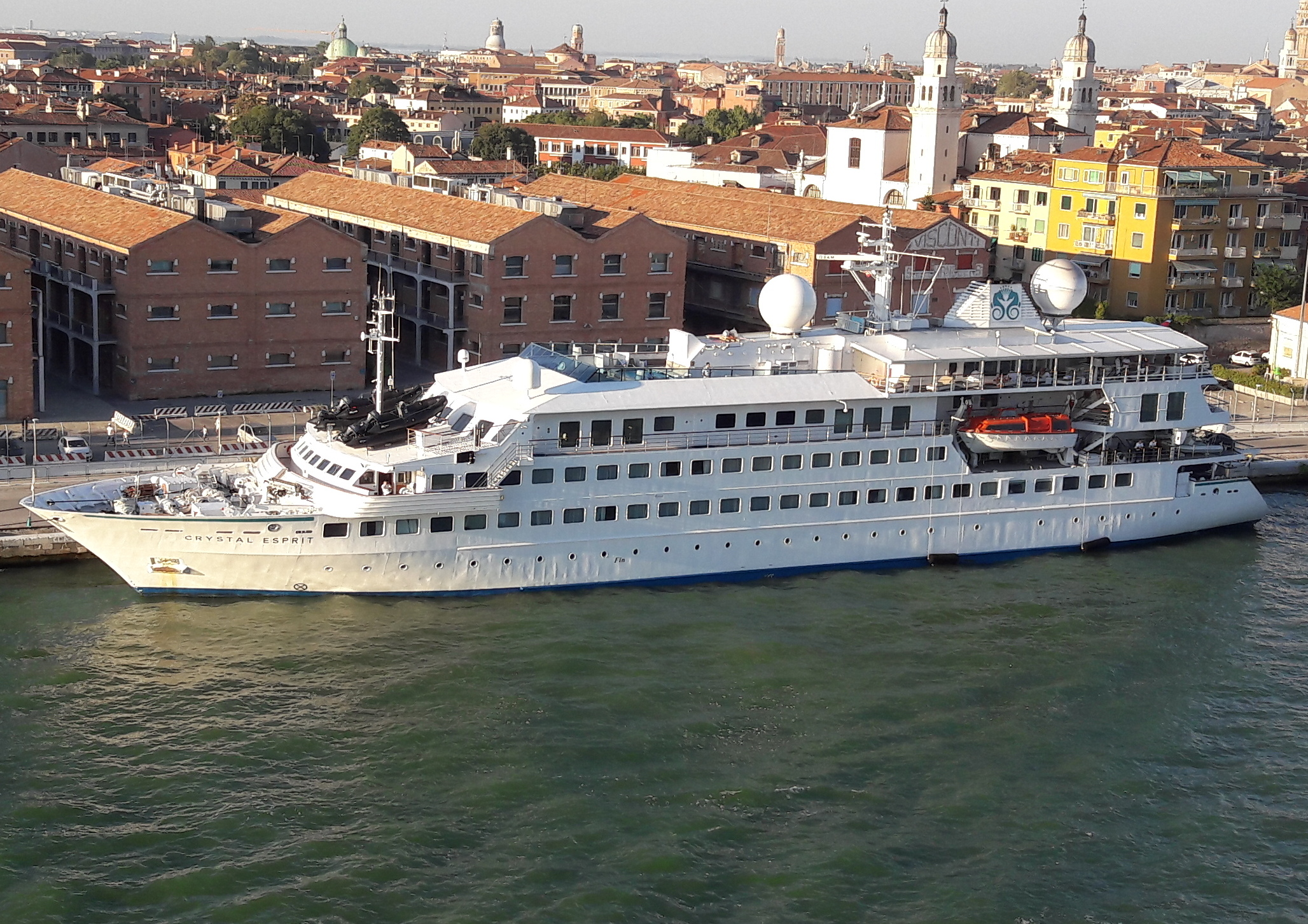

History

The Bahamas
- Name: 1989–1991: Lady Diana; 1991–1994: Aurora I; 1994–2015: MegaStar Taurus; 2015–2021: Crystal Esprit; 2021–present: National Geographic Islander II
- Operator: Windsor Lines (1989–1994); Star Cruises (1994–2015); Crystal Cruises (2015–2021); Lindblad Expeditions (2021-present)
- Port of registry: Nassau, Bahamas
- Builder: Flender Werft
- Yard number: 647
- Laid down: February 8, 1988
- Launched: February 24, 1989
- Completed: December 1, 1991
- Identification: Call sign: C6CL7; IMO number: 8705266; MMSI number: 354264000
- Status: In service

General characteristics
- Tonnage: 3,370 GT
- Length: 85 m (280 feet)
- Decks: 5 decks
- Capacity: 62 passengers
- Crew: 93 crew

National Geographic Islander II is a cruise ship currently operated by Lindblad Expeditions. Built by Flender Werft in Lübeck, Germany, she was laid down in 1988 and floated out as Lady Diana in 1989. She was completed in December 1991 as Aurora I. She and sister ship Aurora II were purchased by Star Cruises in 1994. Aurora I was renamed Megastar Taurus and served from 1994 until being laid up in 2008.

In July 2015, Crystal Cruises announced that she would join its fleet as Crystal Esprit, and on December 20, 2015, she was rechristened at Eden Island Marina in Mahé, Seychelles, by Lady Gaenor Anne Meakes (fiancée of yachtsman Mark Richards).

In September 2021, Crystal announced that they had sold the all-suite ship following a review of its post-pandemic offering. The new owner is Lindblad Expeditions, which has renamed her National Geographic Islander II and intends to base her in the Galapagos Islands, replacing its current National Geographic Islander, in its the alliance with National Geographic Travel. The ship was christened in October 2022.
