= Crystal Cruises =

American cruise line

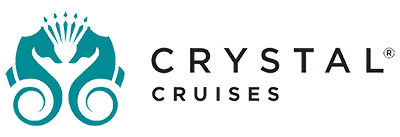
- Company type: Subsidiary
- Founded: 1988; 38 years ago
- Headquarters: Hallandale Beach, Florida, US
- Key people: Manfredi Lefebvre d'Ovidio; (Co-Chairman); Geoffrey Kent; (Co-Chairman)

Crystal Cruises is an American cruise line owned by A&K Travel Group.

It was founded in 1988 by Japanese shipping company Nippon Yusen Kaisha, and sold to Hong Kong-headquartered conglomerate Genting Hong Kong in 2015. Following insolvency in 2022, the Crystal Cruises brand and two cruise ships were bought by A&K Travel Group, to recommence operations in 2023, with headquarters in Hallandale Beach, Florida. The new company has announced major refurbishments and enhancements for the two ships in a Fincantieri shipyard in Trieste, Italy, including increasing the number of butler suites and reducing guest capacity, and resumed service in July 2023 with shore excursions organized by Abercrombie & Kent.

== History ==
The company was founded in 1988 by Nippon Yusen Kaisha (NYK). Its first ship was Crystal Harmony.

On March 3, 2015, NYK announced that it was selling Crystal Cruises to Genting Hong Kong. The sale price was US$550 million in cash, subject to certain adjustment items. On May 15, 2015, GHK announced that it had closed on the acquisition.

On July 20, 2015, Crystal announced that it would expand to provide expedition cruises, river cruises, and private jet travel.

On February 4, 2016, Crystal Cruises signed a purchase option for the SS United States, also providing funding for docking costs for the ship in Philadelphia for nine months while it conducted a feasibility study into returning the ship to service. However, the plan was dropped on August 5, 2016, citing technical challenges. It also announced a donation of US$350,000 to cover docking costs through to the end of the year.

In September 2019, Crystal Cruises announced that it would have Broadway-themed cruises available starting in 2020.

In August 2020, Crystal cancelled all cruises for the remainder of the year. Its parent company Genting Hong Kong had suspended payments to creditors citing the impact of the COVID-19 pandemic. The new 200-passenger Crystal Endeavor was under construction at the time, with delivery scheduled for November 2020; that was delayed for a year because of the suspension of operations at the MV Werften shipyard in Germany.

In March 2021, Crystal announced all-Bahamas cruises aboard Crystal Serenity would start on July 3, 2021, with departures from Nassau and Bimini to work around CDC cruise bans due to COVID-19 in the US. Ports of call within the Bahamas included Harbour Island, Great Exuma, Long Island, and San Salvador. All passengers were required to be vaccinated for COVID-19. The opening booking day set a record for the most bookings on a single day in the company's history. Some destinations expressed concerns with the company's announcement, lack of consultation with local stakeholders, and negative impact to their existing tourism economy.

Following the insolvency of Genting Hong Kong, Crystal suspended operations of all its cruise ships in January 2022. Crystal Symphony and Crystal Serenity were subsequently arrested in Freeport, Bahamas over unpaid bills in February, and the company's headquarters in the United States closed. Meanwhile, V.Ships Leisure was appointed by the liquidators to manage Crystal's ships.

On June 22, 2022, it was announced that A&K Travel Group, owned by Manfredi Lefebvre d'Ovidio and Geoffrey Kent had bought the bankrupt line's brand and two ocean vessels, Crystal Serenity and Crystal Symphony, intending to return the ships to service in 2023.

Two new ships were ordered at Fincantieri in June 2024 for delivery from 2028 onwards. In Autumn, a third ship was ordered.

== Former Sub-brands ==
=== Crystal Yacht Cruises ===
Crystal Yacht Cruises launched in December 2015 with the Crystal Esprit. The 62-guest, 3,000-ton yacht was outfitted with features including a two-passenger submarine, four 10-passenger zodiacs for excursions, and a 12-passenger yacht tender for boating adventures. Additionally, water skis, wake boards, kayaks, jet skis, fishing, and scuba and snorkel equipment were available.

=== Crystal Expedition Cruises ===
On January 15, 2018, the company cut steel for Crystal Endeavor at MV Werften, part of a family of shipyards known for their passenger-ship, icebreaker, and private-yacht building expertise. The new PC6-designated expedition yacht was to launch on July 17, 2021, in Reykjavik, Iceland. Crystal Endeavor has a displacement of 20,200 GT and would operate polar expeditions and voyages in remote tropical regions. The yacht was to offer accommodation for 200 guests.

=== Crystal River Cruises ===
In July 2016, Crystal launched Crystal River Cruises with the refurbished vessel Crystal Mozart. Crystal Bach and Crystal Mahler, the first two of four Rhine-class new-build river ships, were added in 2017 followed by Crystal Debussy and Crystal Ravel, in 2018.

=== Crystal Luxury Air/Crystal AirCruises ===
Crystal Luxury Air private jet service launched in 2015 with the company's Bombardier Global Express jet, available for charter and accommodating 12 guests. In August 2017, Crystal AirCruises took flight with the launch of Crystal Skye, a Boeing 777-200LR configured with 88 first-class, flat-bed seats, a lounge/dining room that seats 24, and a full bar. The National Hockey League was one of its first three charter customers. In addition, the company took delivery of a Boeing 787 Dreamliner in May 2017. From November 2017, this aircraft was in storage, until it was sold for $25 million in 2024 to be scrapped by C&L Aviation. The aircraft is estimated to have made just 13 hours in flight. The plans to configure it with 60 first-class seats for Crystal Luxury Air, offering 14- to 28-day around-the-world private jet journeys, never materialized.

== Fleet ==
=== Current fleet ===
Name	Built	Builder	Entered service for Crystal	Gross tonnage	Flag	Notes	Image
Crystal Symphony	1995	Knaerner Masa-Yards Turku New Shipyard	1995	51,044	Bahamas		
Crystal Serenity	2003	Chantiers de l'Atlantique	2003	68,870	Bahamas		

=== Former fleet ===
Name	Built	Builder	Entered service for Crystal	Gross tonnage	Flag	Notes	Image
Crystal Harmony	1989	Mitsubishi Heavy Industries	1990	50,142	Bahamas	Transferred to Nippon Yusen Kaisha in 2006 and renamed Asuka II	
Expedition ships
Crystal Esprit	1991	Flender Werke	2015	3,370	Bahamas	Previously MegaStar Taurus; Sold to Lindblad Expeditions in 2021.	
Crystal Endeavor	2021	MV Werften	2021	20,449	Bahamas	Acquired by Silversea Cruises June 2022.	
River ships
Crystal Mozart	1987	Deggendorfer Werft und Eisenbau; MV Werften (redesign)	2016	532	Malta	Operated by Crystal River Cruises; Named after Wolfgang Amadeus Mozart	
Crystal Bach	2017	MV Werften	2017		Malta	Operated by Crystal River Cruises; Named after Johann Sebastian Bach	Crystal Bach in Kiel Canal I
Crystal Mahler	2017	MV Werften	2017		Malta	Operated by Crystal River Cruises; Named after Gustav Mahler	
Crystal Debussy	2018	MV Werften	2018		Malta	Operated by Crystal River Cruises; Named after Claude Debussy	
Crystal Ravel	2018	MV Werften	2018		Malta	Operated by Crystal River Cruises; Named after Maurice Ravel	
Aircraft
N989SF	2007	Bombardier Aerospace	2015	N/A	United States	Bombardier Global Express. Operated by Corporate Flight Management.	
Crystal Skye; P4-XTL	2011	Boeing	2017	N/A	Aruba	Ex Air Austral Boeing 777-200LR reg F-OLRA. Operated by Comlux.	
N947BA	2016	Boeing	2017	N/A	United States	Ex Royal Air Maroc Boeing 787-8 reg CN-RGB. Never entered service.	
