= Lee Wachtstetter =

American author and cruise passenger (1928–2026)

Leona Wachtstetter
- Born: May 23, 1928
- Died: April 13, 2026 (aged 97)
- Other name: Mama Lee
- Known for: Living on a cruise ship for a decade
- Notable work: I May Be Homeless, But You Should See My Yacht
- Children: 4

Leona D. Wachtstetter (May 23, 1928 – April 13, 2026), nicknamed Mama Lee, was an American author and long-term passenger on cruise ships. Wachtstetter worked as a registered nurse, while her husband, Mason Wachtstetter, performed real estate appraisals and worked as a banker. The couple went on their first cruise in 1962 and went on 89 cruises together in total. Mason, who died in 1997, told Leona the day before his death to continue traveling on cruise ships. She initially traveled many times on cruise ships with a friend before becoming a solo traveler. Wachtstetter began living on the Holland America Line cruise ship MS Prinsendam in 2005.

Wachtstetter, who spent hours dancing on cruise ships, moved in 2008 to living full-time on the Crystal Serenity after Prinsendam stopped providing trained dance partners. It cost her US$164,000 in 2015 to live on the Crystal Serenity. In 2017, she published the book I May Be Homeless, But You Should See My Yacht detailing her life on Crystal Serenity for a decade.

== Background ==
Leona Wachtstetter was born in May 1928 to Agnes and Joseph W. Davis, a dental surgeon. Her younger brother, Richard, was born in 1936, and the family lived in Freeport, a village on Long Island. She frequently enjoyed accompanying her parents on their cabin cruiser, a 36-foot (11 m) boat with six beds that they routinely used during weekends including going to Jones Beach Island. Wachtstetter took summer school classes immediately after her high school junior year. After completing the classes, Wachtstetter had sufficient credits to immediately be done with high school. With her mother encouraging her to begin university, she did not return to high school so did not attend her senior prom or high school graduation. Wachtstetter enrolled in Adelphi College's pre-nursing curriculum. After her father had an unsuccessful eye surgery, he needed to resign from his dentist job. Her father, mother, and brother relocated to Hollywood, Florida. Wachtstetter continued attending classes at Adelphi but several months later, her father asked her to join them and she visited Hollywood during the Easter break in 1946 for two weeks. She returned to Adelphi, where she completed her spring semester before moving to Florida to enroll in the School of Nursing at University of Miami's Jackson Memorial Hospital. She met her husband, Mason Wachtstetter, on a beach in Hollywood.

Her husband did real estate appraisals and worked as a banker, while she was a registered nurse at South Broward Hospital and Clinic. They lived in a five-bedroom, 10-acre Fort Lauderdale, Florida, house. She went on her first cruise with her husband in 1962 on P&O's cruise ship SS Florida that traveled from Miami to Nassau, Bahamas. Her husband cofounded the Hollywood Playhouse, and in the 1960s, she performed in plays including A Majority of One in 1966 and the comedy Dear Me, the Sky is Falling in 1967. She and her husband went on a three-week cruise and upon returning chose to have him retire in 1976 from Home Federal Savings and Loan Association, where he had been vice president. They were married for 50 years until he died on September 25, 1997, from cancer at age 76. The Wachtstetters went on 89 cruises together. While she was a dancing enthusiast, her husband did not enjoy dancing, so he told her to ask cruise ship dance hosts to dance with her. The couple had four children (three sons and a daughter), who accompanied them on numerous cruises, and seven grandchildren. Her daughter died of cancer in December 2011. In the early 21st century, Lee underwent cataract surgery.

Wachtstetter died on April 13, 2026, at the age of 97. L.C. Poitier Funeral Home, a funeral home in Pompano Beach, Florida, posted her death notice.

== Living on cruise ships ==
Wachtstetter's husband advised her, "Don't stop cruising," the day before his death. Following his advice, Wachtstetter initially traveled numerous times on cruise ships with a friend before boarding ships as a solo traveler. A friend maintained the house while she was away for as much as 11 months in the year. After her daughter proposed that she do so, Wachtstetter sold the house along with her car and nearly all her possessions. In 2008, the friend who was maintaining the house purchased it from Wachtstetter.

Beginning in 2005 when Wachtstetter was 76, she lived on the Holland America Line cruise ship MS Prinsendam. Wachtstetter was a dancing enthusiast. After Prinsendam stopped providing trained dance partners, she moved in 2008 to living full-time on the Crystal Serenity. Crystal Serenity has 13 decks and 535 rooms and accommodates 1,070 passengers and 655 crew. Wachtstetter liked that Crystal Serenity provided dance partners. Each evening, she spent two hours dancing on the ship's Palm Court lounge while the Crystal Sextet band performed music. Multiple times every week, the ship's dancing teachers gave her and other passengers free lessons. In a sign of deep respect for her based on their customs, the Filipino crew gave her the nickname Mama Lee.

In 2015, Wachtstetter spent US$164,000 to live in cabin 7080, a one-person window room on the seventh deck of Crystal Serenity that is 276 sq ft (25.6 m^{2}). She fund her cruises and lifestyle through assets her late husband left to her. Wachtstetter ate both meals that were included in the base price and upcharge options. During dinner, she met people while seated at an eight-person table. After going on cruises, she gained 25 lb (11 kg) and attempted to lose weight through maintaining a liquid diet consisting of fruits and vegetables for four months. For entertainment, she attended performances, lectures, the captain's cocktail celebrations, and film showings, and ballroom dancing every night with dance partners provided by the cruise line. She needlepointed for a substantial amount of time on the ship's Palm Court lounge, and gave the embroidered work to the ship's staff. Items she makes for the staff include toys, tablecloths, and handbags.

Wachtstetter seldom left the ship when it docked since she had probably been to the ports previously, but when the ship docked at Istanbul, she visited the Grand Bazaar, which offers a lot of fancy clothing that she likes. While cruising, Wachtstetter used her laptop to remain in contact with her children and grandchildren, one of whom she reportedly spoke with every day. Her family joined her for dinners when the ship docked in Miami. Wachtstetter visited her family whenever her cruise ship stopped in Miami, which happened around five times per year. Every year during Christmas, she spent several weeks on land with her children and grandchildren. She viewed it as a good opportunity not to be on the ship, as numerous guests are often children.

Wachtstetter wrote a book about her experience living on Crystal Serenity titled I May Be Homeless, But You Should See My Yacht. Published in 2017, the book discusses her decision to sell her large house after her husband's death and become a full-time cruise ship resident rather than relocating to an assisted living facility. CNN said her memoir describes "her cruising shenanigans" such as a Thailand auto rickshaw driver's kidnap of her and her encountering a Mediterranean "rogue wave". CNBC called the book "a much-read memoir".

Before becoming a long-term passenger on Crystal Serenity, Wachtstetter had been on about 200 cruises. By January 2016, she had been on the ship for seven and a half years, which amounted to 215 cruises.

== Works ==
- Wachtstetter, Mama Lee; Kita, Joe (2017). I May Be Homeless, But You Should See My Yacht. K-S Publishing. ISBN 978-0-692-93256-8.
- Wachtstetter, Lee (March 7, 2016). "What it's like to live on a cruise ship for 8 years". The Washington Post. Archived from the original on August 7, 2022.
