= Crystal Symphony =

Cruise ship built in 1995

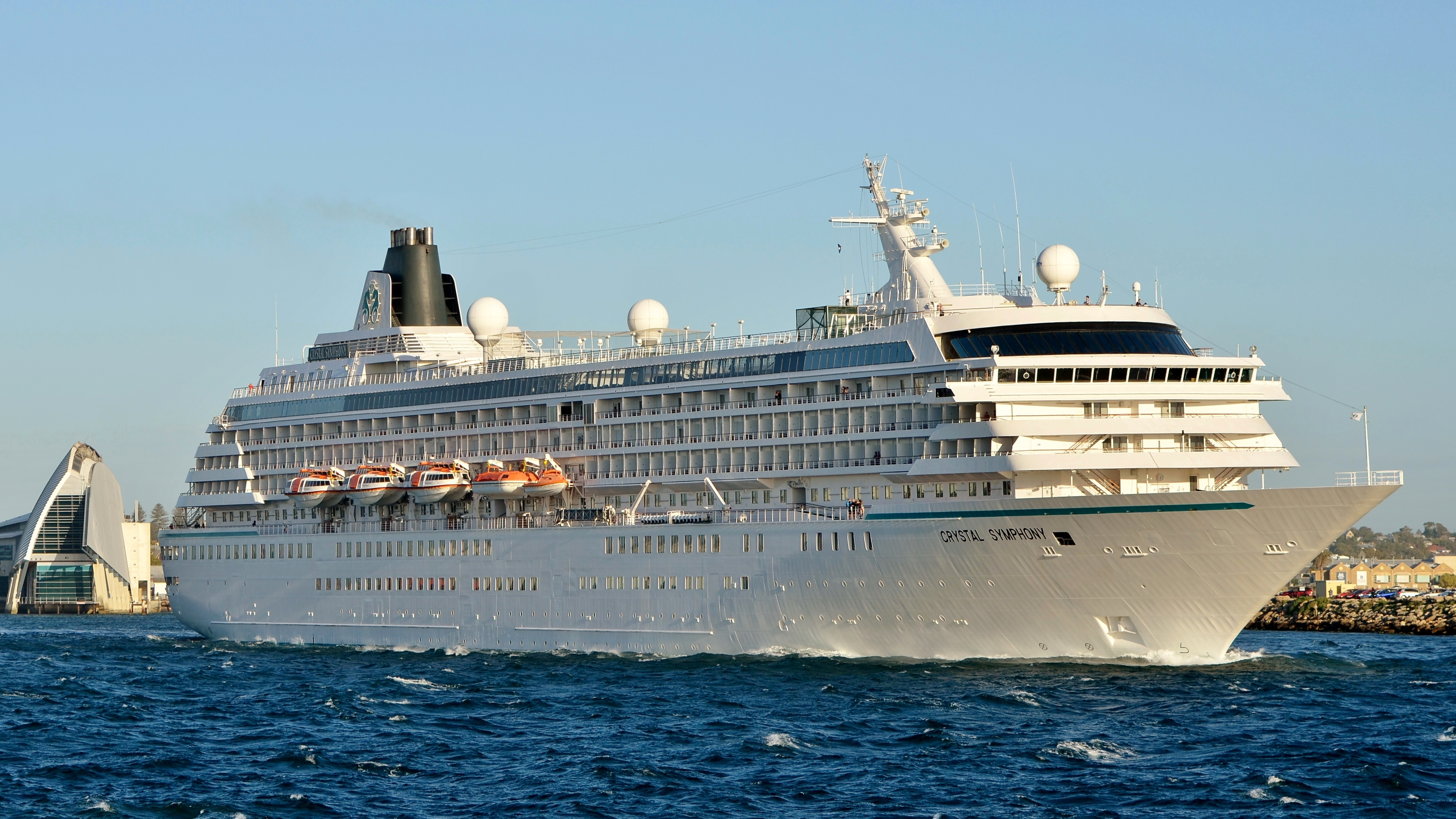
- Crystal Symphony departing Fremantle, Australia in 2013

History
- Name: Crystal Symphony
- Owner: 1995-2022: Crystal Cruises; 2022-present: A&K Travel Group
- Operator: 1995-2022: Crystal Cruises; 2022-present: V-Ships
- Port of registry: Nassau, Bahamas
- Ordered: 1992
- Builder: Kværner Masa-Yards Turku New Shipyard, Finland
- Cost: $250 million
- Yard number: 1323
- Launched: 5 January 1995
- Completed: 1995
- In service: 3 May 1995
- Identification: Call sign: C6MY5; IMO number: 9066667; MMSI number: 309168000
- Status: In service

General characteristics
- Tonnage: 51,044 GT
- Length: 238 m (781 ft)
- Beam: 30.18 m (99.02 ft)
- Draught: 7.59 m (24.90 ft)
- Decks: 12 decks; 8 decks passenger accessible
- Installed power: Six Wärtsilä-Sulzer diesel engines; 25,260 kW (33,880 hp) (combined)
- Propulsion: Diesel-electric; two shafts
- Speed: 20 knots (37 km/h; 23 mph) (service); 21 knots (39 km/h; 24 mph) (maximum)
- Capacity: 650 passengers
- Crew: 495

Crystal Symphony is a cruise ship owned by Abercrombie & Kent and operated for Crystal Cruises. She was built in 1995 at Kværner Masa-Yards Turku New Shipyard, Finland. She is the oldest vessel in the Crystal Cruises fleet.

== Concept and construction ==
Crystal Symphony was ordered in December 1992 and entered service in May 1995.

The ship was docked in Sydney Harbour for the 2000 Summer Olympics.

The ship was refitted a second time in 2006. This process, which cost US$23 million, was the largest refit ever for Crystal Cruises. During this refit, Crystal employed over 750 external workers to join the existing 545 crew to ensure a timely completion. The refit was done in BAE Systems Norfolk Ship Repair in Norfolk, Virginia.

In 2009 Crystal Symphony underwent a third refit costing US$25 million. The refit was completed at Boston Ship Repair's South Boston Dry dock.

In June 2012, the ship completed a two-week "extreme makeover" done by 1,100 workers (including the crew) at the Blohm + Voss docks in Germany.

== Insolvency and arrest ==
At the beginning of 2022, Crystal Cruises' parent company, Genting Hong Kong, was experiencing financial difficulties. Due to the outstanding balance of approximately $4.6 million in fuel bills, a warrant was issued in January 2022 for the vessel's arrest should it re-enter U.S. waters. As a result, the ship changed course to Bimini, Bahamas, and arrangements were made to transport its passengers back to the United States. Genting Hong Kong subsequently filed for bankruptcy and suspended operations of its cruise ships. Thereafter, on February 4, 2022, both Crystal Symphony and its sister ship, Crystal Serenity, were arrested in Bahamian waters. The ships were then placed under the management of V.Ships Leisure, which was appointed by the liquidators to assume control of Crystal's ships.

== Change of ownership ==
On June 22, 2022, it was announced that A&K Travel Group had purchased the brand and two ocean vessels of the bankrupt cruise line, intending to return the ships to service in 2023. The Crystal Symphony was acquired for $25 million.

Beginning in July 2022, the ship underwent a refurbishment in Trieste, Italy, and on September 1, 2023, returned to service under the Crystal Cruises brand.
