= MV Werften =

Hong Kong-German shipbuilder

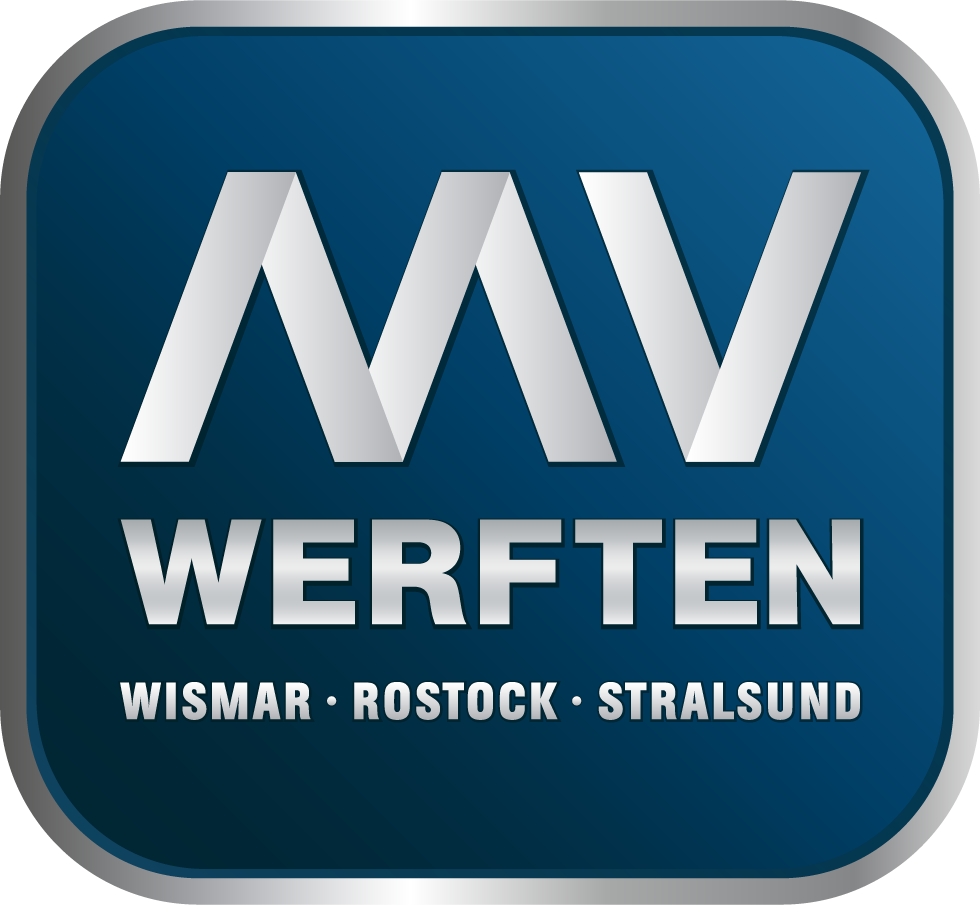
- Company type: Shipyard
- Founder: 2016
- Defunct: 2022
- Successor: TKMS Wismar
- Headquarters: Germany
- Parent: Genting Hong Kong

MV Werften was a Hong Kong–German shipbuilding company that operated three facilities in eastern Germany to construct cruise ships for parent company Genting Hong Kong.

In January 2022, MV Werften filed for bankruptcy, and an administrator was appointed by the court to oversee the bankruptcy proceedings. The company's three yards were sold off.

== History ==
The company was originated in Genting Hong Kong's purchase in April 2016 of three shipyards from Nordic Yards, located in Wismar, Stralsund, and Rostock-Warnemünde. The yards were initially combined with Lloyd Werft, previously purchased by Genting, to form the Lloyd Werft Group, but in July 2016 the three eastern ex-Nordic yards were organized into MV Werften, headquartered in Wismar and led by Jarmo Laakso.

In August 2016, MV Werften's first newbuild vessels, two river cruise ships of the Rhine class named Crystal Bach and Crystal Mahler, were laid down at the Wismar shipyard. In November, Genting Hong Kong publicized further plans for its shipbuilding plans at MV Werften—four river cruise vessels for Crystal Cruises under the Crystal River Cruises brand to be delivered in 2017 and 2018, followed by a 20,000 GT Endeavor class yacht annually for Crystal Yacht Cruises in 2019—2021, with Dream Cruises receiving a Global class cruise ship in 2020 and a sister ship the following year. At full capacity post-2021, the three shipyards are planned to be able to build two vessels of both the Endeavor and Global classes annually.

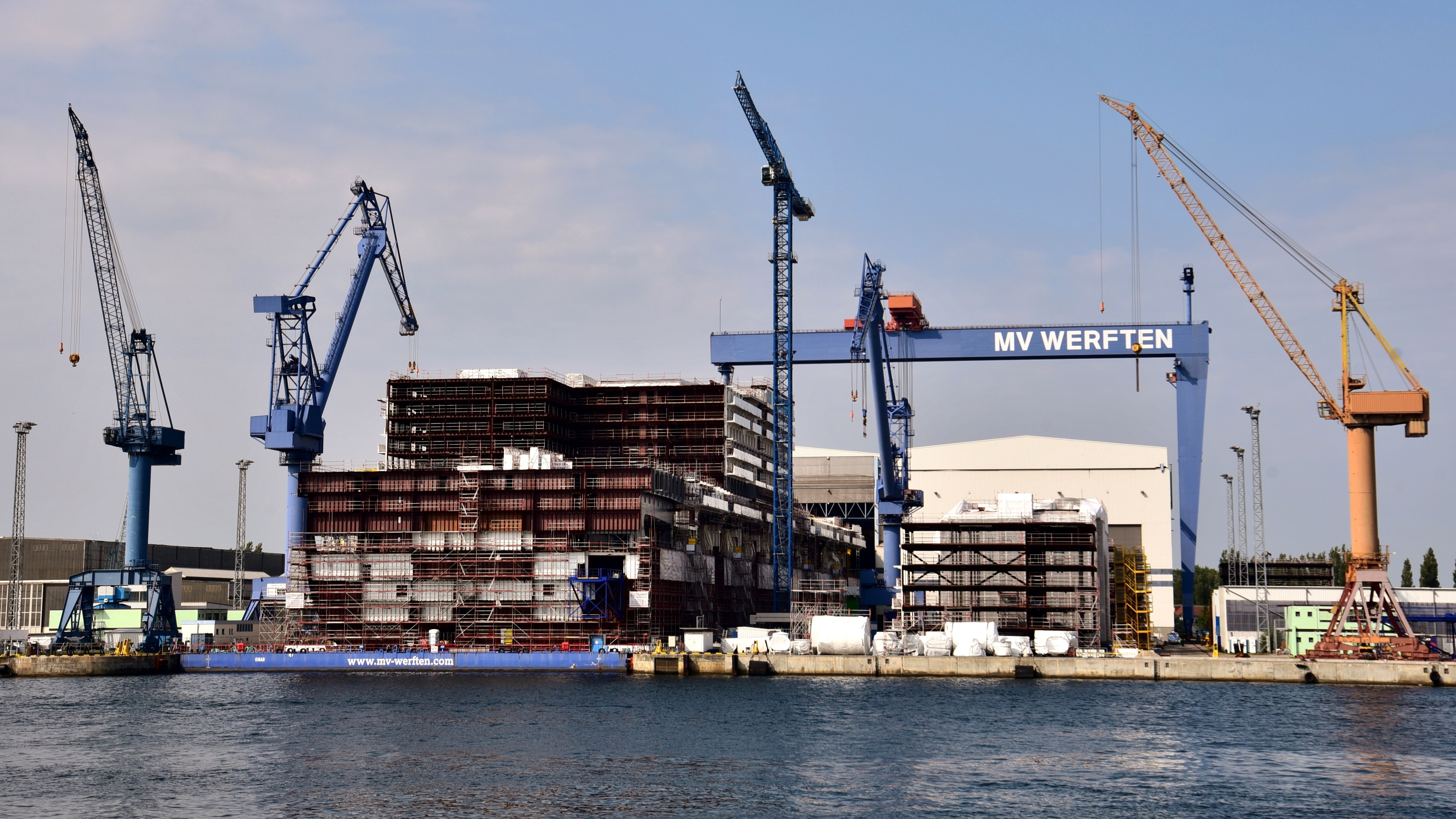
Rostock shipyard with Global Dream under construction

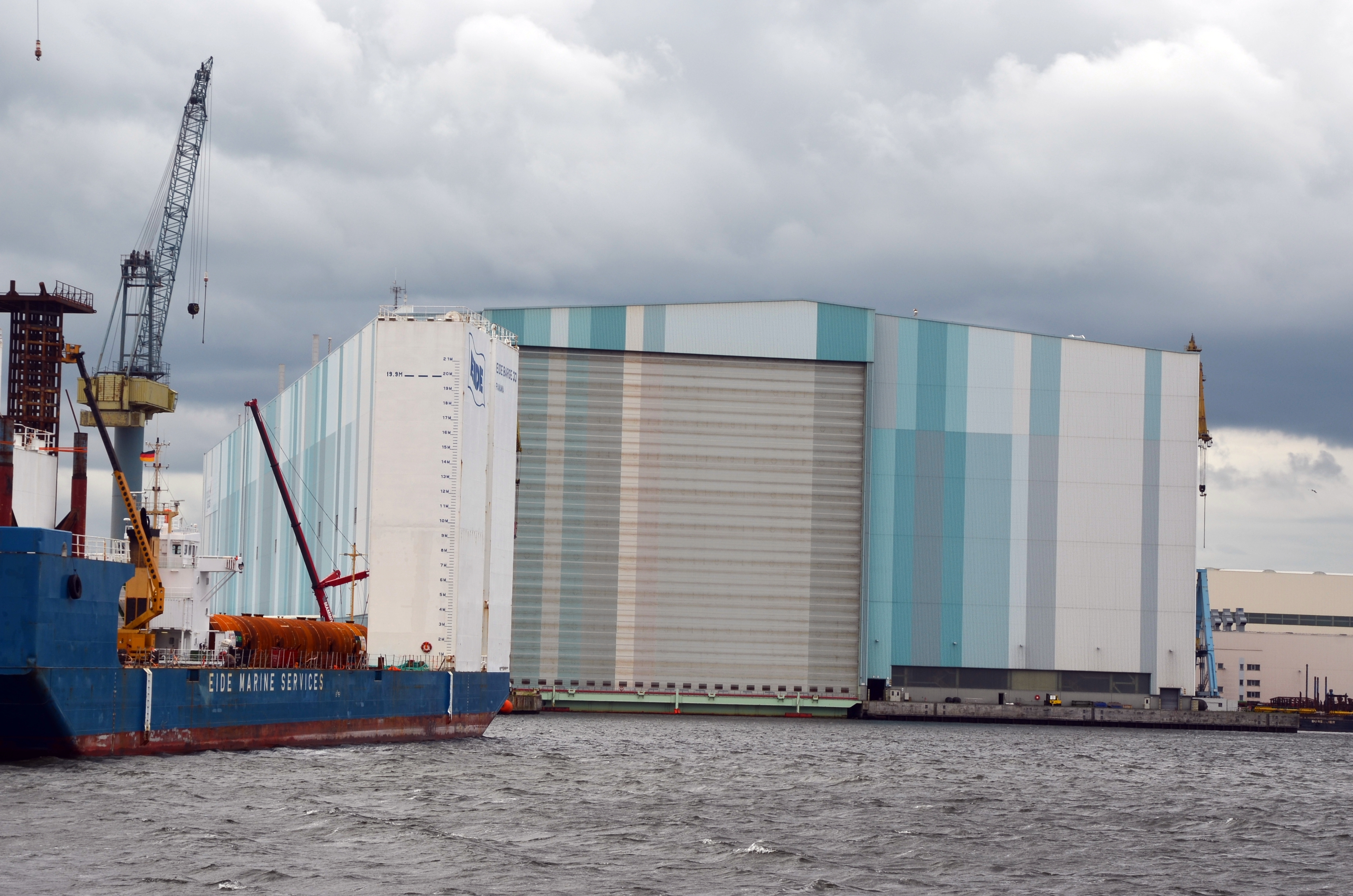
Facility in Wismar

The first Rhine class vessel, Crystal Bach, was delivered in August 2017, followed by Crystal Mahler in September.

In January 2018, shipbuilding began at the Stralsund shipyard with a ceremony for the first steelcutting in the construction of Crystal Endeavor, the first Endeavor class yacht. In March, construction of the first Global class ship began, with components to be built at both the Rostock and Wismar yards and the vessel assembled in Wismar.

In December 2019, Genting Hong Kong announced that MV Werften would build a new class of mid-size cruise ships, named the Universal class, which would measure 88,000 gross tons with a capacity for 2,000 passengers. The first ship of the class was scheduled for delivery in late 2022.

Due to the COVID-19 pandemic, MV Werften suspended operations in March 2020, delaying the expected deliveries of both Universal and Global class vessels. In July 2020, MV Werften received €175 million in financial aid from a consortium of commercial and state sources, which was expected to keep the shipyard solvent until an expected federal aid package of up to €570 million later in the year. In October 2020, MV Werften received a €193 million loan from the German federal government's Economic Stabilisation Fund, which allowed for the resumption of work that month on Crystal Endeavor, with a target of a March 2021 delivery, and Global Dream.

=== Bankruptcy ===
In January 2022, MV Werften filed for bankruptcy, following a breakdown of talks between the German government and Genting Hong Kong to secure further support to refinance its shipyards' operations. An administrator was appointed by the courts, with a stated aim to pay the outstanding salaries of the workers and complete Global Dream.

The shipyard in Rostock was sold to the German Navy and renamed Marinearsenal Warnowwerft. The Wismar facility was sold to Thyssen Krupp Marine Systems. The Stralsund facility was sold to the City of Stralsund.

== Facilities ==
MV Werften's largest shipyard is in Rostock, with 850,000 square metres (210 acres) of total space, of which 85,000 square metres (21 acres) is covered. When Genting Hong Kong purchased the yard, it had a single shipbuilding hall measuring 320 metres (1,050 ft) long by 54 metres (177 ft) wide, with an interior clearance of 80 metres (260 ft). In August 2017, construction began on a second hall, 385 metres (1,263 ft) by 99 metres (325 ft) by 24 metres (79 ft), to support construction of Global class ships by building large modules.

The Wismar shipyard is 560,000 square metres (140 acres) in size, of which 170,000 square metres (42 acres) is covered, and has a 340 metres (1,120 ft) by 67 metres (220 ft) by 72 metres (236 ft) building hall. The Stralsund yard is 340,000 square metres (84 acres), of which 90,000 square metres (22 acres) is covered, and has a 300 metres (980 ft) by 108 metres (354 ft) by 74 metres (243 ft) building hall.
