= MS Asuka II =

Cruise ship built in 1990

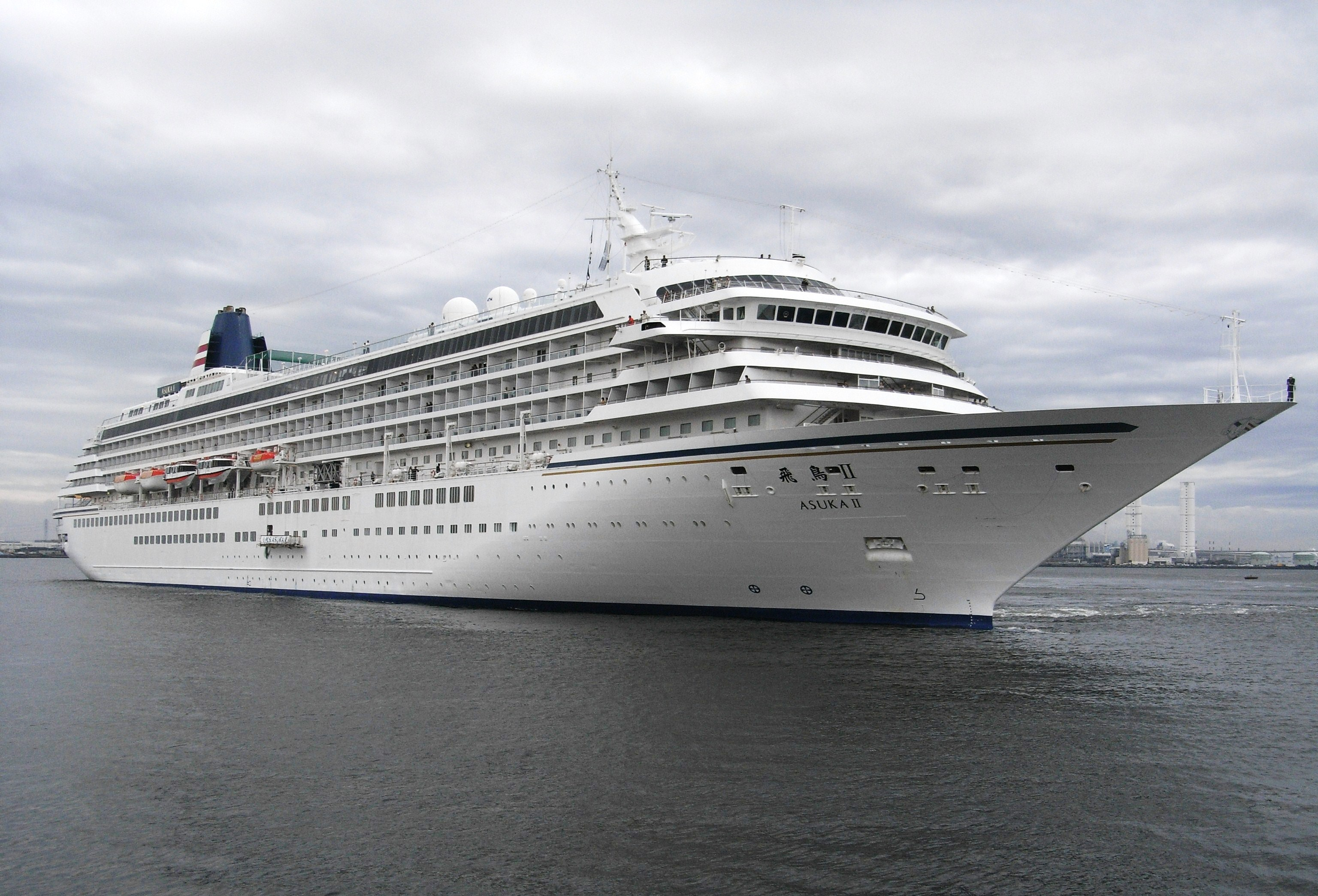
- Asuka II in 2009.

History

Japan
- Name: 1990–2006: Crystal Harmony; 2006 onwards: Asuka II (飛鳥II)
- Owner: 1990–2006: Crystal Cruises; 2006 onwards: Nippon Yusen Kaisha
- Operator: 1990–2006: Crystal Cruises; 2006 onwards: Nippon Yusen Kaisha
- Port of registry: 1990–2006: Nassau, Bahamas; 2006–2013: Yokohama, Japan
- Builder: Mitsubishi Heavy Industries, Nagasaki, Japan
- Yard number: 2100
- Launched: 30 September 1989
- Acquired: July 1990
- Identification: IMO number: 8806204; MMSI number: 432545000; Call sign 7JBI
- Status: In service

General characteristics
- Type: Cruise ship
- Tonnage: 50,142 GT; 8,642 DWT
- Length: 241 m (790 ft 8 in)
- Beam: 29.6 m (97 ft 1 in)
- Draught: 7.8 m (25 ft 7 in)
- Decks: 8
- Installed power: Four MAN diesel Engines; 32,800 kW (combined)
- Speed: 21 knots (39 km/h; 24 mph)
- Capacity: 960 passengers
- Crew: 545

Japanese name
- Kanji: 飛鳥II
- Hiragana: あすかツー
Transcriptions
- Romanization: Asuka II

MS Asuka II (飛鳥II) is a cruise ship owned and operated by Nippon Yusen Kaisha, which operates the cruise division NYK Cruises (a.k.a. Asuka Cruise). She was originally built by the Mitsubishi Heavy Industries shipyard in Nagasaki, Japan, as Crystal Harmony for Crystal Cruises. In 2006, Crystal Harmony was transferred from the fleet of Crystal Cruises to that of Crystal's parent company, Nippon Yusen Kaisha, and entered service under her current name. As of August 2022, she was the largest cruise ship in Japan.

== Service history ==
=== 1990–2006: Crystal Harmony ===
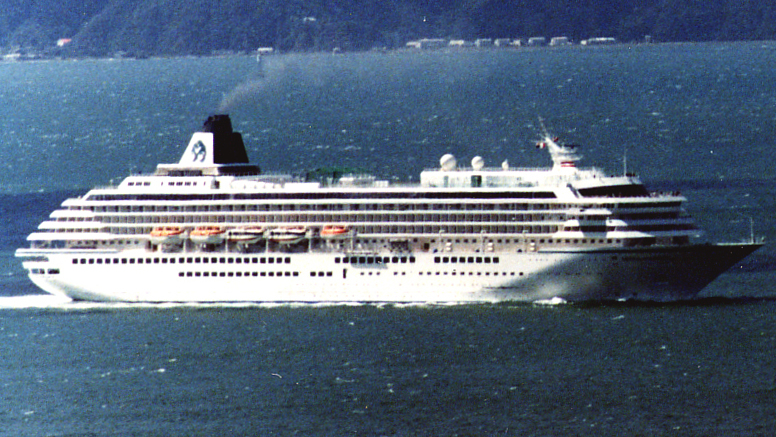
Asuka II as Crystal Harmony

During Crystal Harmony's maiden voyage in the South American and Caribbean waters, the ship caught on fire due to a fuel leak in an auxiliary engine room some 200 miles (320 km) from Cristóbal. Crystal Harmony drifted without power for sixteen hours but after repairs made it to port under her own steam and disembarked her passengers in Panama. She sailed to the island of Curaçao, escorted by a tugboat, for repairs.

=== 2006 onwards: Asuka II ===
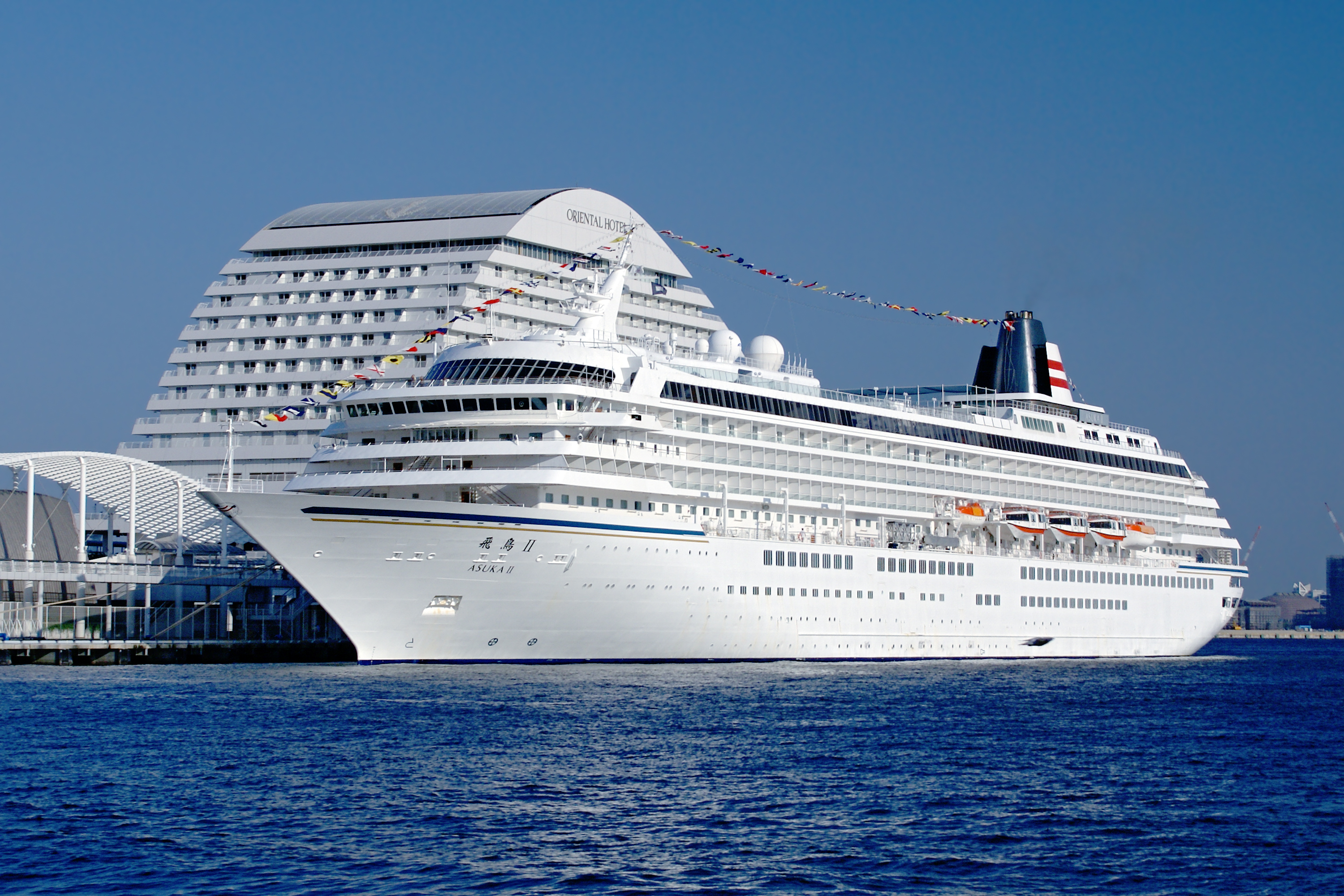
Asuka II moored at Kobe, Japan in September 2006

After fifteen years of service, Crystal Harmony was retired from the Crystal fleet in 2005. She was transferred to the parent company Nippon Yusen Kaisha to replace the Asuka. She then underwent renovation and re-entered service as Asuka II.

She caught fire again on June 16, 2020, while at dock in Yokohama.
