= Genting Hong Kong =

Holding company that operates cruise and resort businesses

- Type: Public limited company Subsidiary
- Traded as: SEHK: 678
- Industry: Tourism
- Founded: 10 November 1993
- Defunct: 7 October 2022
- Fate: Bankruptcy, Liquidation
- Headquarters: Hong Kong
- Brands: Star Cruises; Crystal Cruises; Dream Cruises; Newport World Resorts; (Resorts World Manila); MV Werften
- Services: Resort; cruise
- Parent: Genting Group

Chinese name
- Traditional Chinese: 雲頂香港有限公司
- Simplified Chinese: 云顶香港有限公司
- Hanyu Pinyin: Yúndǐng Xiānggǎng Yǒuxiàngōngsī
- Jyutping: wan4 deng2 hoeng1 gong2 jau5 haan6 gung1 si1
- Website: web.archive.org/*/https://www.gentinghk.com

Genting Hong Kong Limited (Chinese: 雲頂香港有限公司), previously Star Cruises Limited, was a holding company that operated cruise and resort businesses. It was headquartered in Ocean Centre (海洋中心), Tsim Sha Tsui, Hong Kong and listed on the Hong Kong Stock Exchange (SEHK: 678). It was part of the Genting Group, whose chairman Lim Kok Thay was also the chairman and majority shareholder of Genting Hong Kong with 69% ownership of April 2020. It also owned the cruise lines Crystal Cruises, Dream Cruises and Star Cruises (collectively Genting Cruise Lines), Resorts World Manila, and the MV Werften and Lloyd Werft shipyards.

On 19 January 2022, the company filed for bankruptcy in the Bermuda Islands. After reviewing its financial conditions, the company filed for liquidation on 18 January 2022. The motion for liquidation was approved by Bermuda's Supreme Court on 7 October 2022.

== History ==
Genting Hong Kong was originally a subsidiary of Genting Group with a 17.8% stake owned by Genting Berhad.

In 10 November 1993, Genting established Star Cruises.

In 2000, Genting's Star Cruises purchased Norwegian Cruise Line, but later sold half of the company to Apollo Management in 2007. A 2013 IPO of Norwegian Cruise Line further reduced Star Cruises' ownership share to 28%.

In 2015, Genting purchased luxury cruise line Crystal Cruises, Singaporean nightclub Zouk, and a majority stake in German shipyard Lloyd Werft. In November of that year, Genting also introduced Dream Cruises as a new luxury cruise brand in Asia.

In May 2016, Genting purchased the remaining 30% of Lloyd Werft, as well as Nordic Yards' Wismar, Warnemunde, and Stralsund shipyards, and combined them to form the Lloyd Werft Group. In June 2016, the three ex-Nordic Yards facilities were spun out again to form MV Werften.

In October 2016, Genting Hong Kong was entirely sold to the Lim Kok Thay's family-owned unit trust Golden Hope Limited as part of a family business restructuring exercise, separating it from Genting Group but retaining it under ownership of Lim Kok Thay's family.

In August 2020, Genting Hong Kong submitted a filing to the Hong Kong Stock Exchange suspending all payments to creditors. It cited the business impact of the COVID-19 pandemic, and the need to preserve liquidity and funds to maintain critical services for the company's operations. It also requested creditors not to enforce payment and sought a plan for debt restructuring. Following the announcement, Genting Hong Kong's share price plunged by more than 40%. In response, Lim has pledged almost all of his stake in Genting Hong Kong as collateral. As of 31 July 2020, it owed US$3.37 billion of debt, including US$3.7 million in bank fees that were in default. In addition, Genting Hong Kong announced a 2020 first-half loss of US$742.6 million, more than ten times its 2019 first-half loss of US$56.5 million.

On 28 August 2020, Lim Keong Hui, Lim Kok Thay's son, stepped down as deputy CEO of Genting Hong Kong to "devote more time to other business commitments". On 1 September 2020, Genting Hong Kong sold the Singaporean nightclub group Zouk for US$10.3 million to Tulipa, a firm owned by Lim Keong Hui.

On 10 January 2022, following a breakdown in talks between the German government and Genting Hong Kong in obtaining further financial support, MV Werften filed for insolvency, triggering the possibility of cross-defaults on up to $2.8 billion of financial arrangements for the Genting Hong Kong group and precipitating a fall in its share price by more than 50%. Hours later, Lloyd Werft also filed for insolvency. On 19 January 2022, Genting Hong Kong filed for liquidation.

It was named Provisional liquidators Edward Middleton and Tiffany Wong Wing Sze of Hong Kong's Alvarez & Marsal Asia Limited and Edward Whittaker of R&H Services Limited in Bermuda to help develop and propose a restructuring proposal in relation to Genting Hong Kong's debt, including nearly US$2.8 billion that was part of financing deals it struck with creditors last June. In a Tuesday filing, Genting Hong Kong said the same liquidators have now been appointed for Dream Cruises to "among other things, develop and propose restructuring proposals relating to Dream Cruises' debt and liabilities." The company also filed a liquidation order for Dream Cruises, it hoped the restructuring would allow the company to continue as a business.

In October 2022, a court in Bermuda ordered the liquidation of Genting Hong Kong and Dream Cruises.

== Resorts ==
Genting Hong Kong partnered with Philippines-based Alliance Global Group to establish Resorts World Manila. It is located across Terminal 3 of Ninoy Aquino International Airport. It houses three hotels: Maxims Tower, Marriott Hotel Manila, and Remington Hotel. The Newport Mall is part of this resort and includes the Newport Cinemas and the 1,500-seat Newport Performing Arts Theater.
