= Atlantis Events =

LGBT vacation company

- Type: LGBT travel
- Industry: LGBT tourism
- Founded: 1991
- Headquarters: West Hollywood, California, US
- Key people: Rich Campbell (CEO and co-founder)
- Products: cruises, resorts, related products
- Website: atlantisevents.com

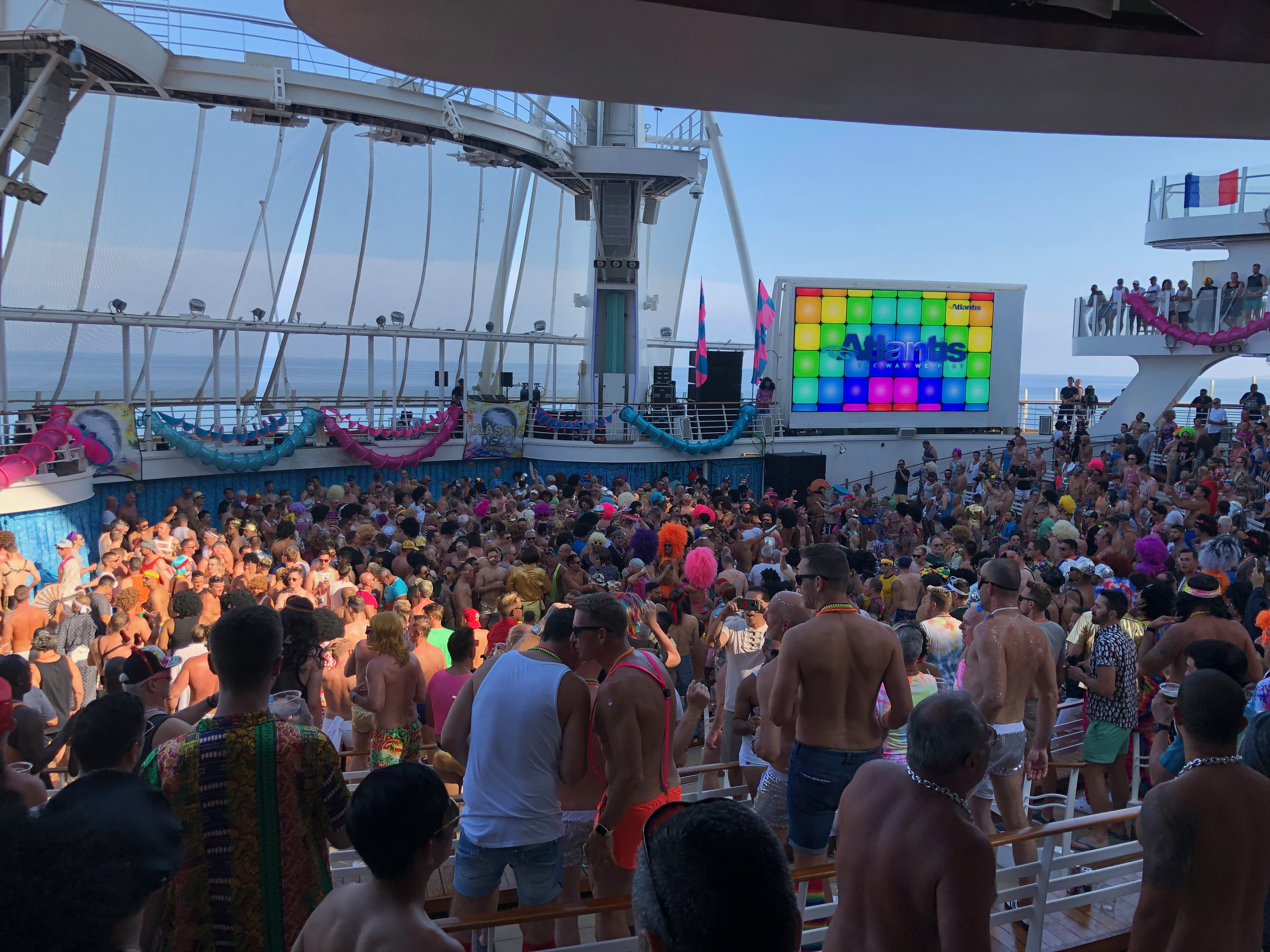
Party on the Oasis of the Seas during an Atlantis Events Mediterranean cruise in August 2019

Atlantis Events is an LGBT vacation company that provides LGBT cruises and resort vacations. A 2017 book on LGBT tourism described it as "the most successful LGBT tour operator in the world". Their vacations are designed and marketed primarily for gay men.

== History ==
Atlantis Events was founded in 1991 to organize resort vacations, beginning with an event at the Club Med resort at Playa Blanca in Costa Careyes, Jalisco, Mexico. The company began chartering cruise ships in 1998. In October 2007, Atlantis acquired competitor RSVP Vacations from RSVP's parent company, PlanetOut.

The company's tours have sometimes experienced negative reactions from anti-gay officials at their destinations. In December 1997, an Atlantis Events cruise on Norwegian Cruise Line's MS Leeward was denied permission make a planned February 1998 stop at Grand Cayman. Caymanian official Thomas C. Jefferson wrote to the cruise line that the cruise's passengers would not "uphold the standards of appropriate behavior expected of visitors". The ship docked in Belize instead. In September 2000, Turkish police blocked Atlantis guests from visiting the Aegean resort town Kuşadası, after the ship was already docked.

In January 2013, the United States Justice Department opened an investigation into Atlantis Events after guests alleged the company failed to provide accommodations for participants with disabilities. In 2018, Atlantis Events reached a settlement with the Justice Department, agreeing to pay civil damages and penalties, as well as developing appropriate accommodations for disabled passengers on its cruises.

=== 2026 entry denial ===
In July 2026, an Atlantis cruise on the Scarlet Lady, a Virgin Voyages ship, was denied entry to the ports of Kuşadası and Istanbul in Turkey, with local authorities citing "moral values" as the reason for the blockade. Subsequently, the ship faced a similar denial of entry when attempting to dock in Egypt instead. Actress Patti LuPone, a scheduled performer on the cruise, publicly criticized the blockade through social media channels. Following the consecutive denials, the ship altered its itinerary to visit Crete and Montenegro instead.

== Destinations ==
Typical cruise itineraries for Atlantis are to the Caribbean, the Mediterranean, the Pacific coast of Mexico, and Australia. Typical locations for land resort vacations are Mexico and the Caribbean. Other destinations – which have included cruises in areas such as Alaska, Asia, and the Baltic, and land vacations in Las Vegas and Kenya – are offered less frequently.

== Incidents ==
- January 2018 – Joel Taylor, a television personality who appeared on the Discovery Channel series, Storm Chasers, died of a drug overdose aboard Harmony of the Seas while sailing with an Atlantis Events charter.
- January 2020 – A man was fatally injured when he jumped from the Atlantis Events-chartered Oasis of the Seas while the ship was docked in Puerto Rico.
- January 2022 – A passenger died unexpectedly aboard the Atlantis Events' 30th Anniversary Cruise on Royal Caribbean's Oasis of the Seas.
- January 2024 – A passenger died unexpectedly aboard Oasis of the Seas while undertaking an Atlantis Events' cruise.

== See also ==
- LGBT marketing
