= Spartacus International Gay Guide =

Gay travel book

Spartacus
- The 2013/14 Spartacus Guide with Davey Wavey on the cover
- Language: English, German, Spanish, French, Italian
- Subject: Gay travel guide
- Publisher: Gay Guide UG

The Spartacus International Gay Guide is an international gay travel application and formerly an annually-published guide. It was founded by John D. Stamford in 1970 as a printed guide, before being bought by Bruno Gmünder in 1987 following investigations into Stamford's tax violations and promotion of paedophilia. It was sold to current owners GayGuide UG in 2017, whereupon the guide became digital only, with the printed version ceasing publication.

== Content ==
=== App ===
The app lists numerous gay bars, clubs, hotels, saunas, beaches and cruising spots which are indicated on the city map via GPS, with photos and additional information on venues also available. The app provides travellers with the biggest gay event calendar worldwide – offering more than 20,000 gay events. Additionally, there is a pride calendar – featuring more than 800 pride dates all over the world. The sauna- & hotel guides are also featured on both the app and the website, and the travel blog offers gay travellers an insight in gay life worldwide. Next to the worldwide version with free selected content, there are four versions available on Android and iOS: "Europe", "North America", "Latin America, Asia, Africa and Oceania" and "Worldwide".

=== (Former) printed guide ===
In the printed guide the content was arranged alphabetically by country, and then alphabetically by city, offering short texts in English, German, French, Spanish and Italian. Countries and cities that are major gay travel destinations were described in greater depth. Each country section included a brief summary of the current laws about homosexuality that are applicable to that country and general social attitudes towards gay people. The majority of the contents were listings for businesses that either specifically catered to gay tourists or that were of interest to gay travellers, such as gay bars, gay-friendly hotels, gay saunas, gay-friendly beaches, support groups, and HIV/AIDS hotlines. Later editions of the guide counted more than 1,200 pages with information for approximately 22,000 businesses in 160 countries.

The criteria that determined which businesses were included in the listings differed from country to country. In countries or cities with a large number of businesses catering to gay customers, only businesses that were specifically gay – and possibly even only the most noteworthy amongst these – were included; in countries where such businesses are uncommon, those that cater to a general clientele but are "gay friendly" were also included.

== History ==
=== Stamford years (1970–1986) ===
The first Spartacus International Gay Guide was published in 1970, with the first (1970) and second (1971) editions being published by JDS Publications of 46 Preston Street, Brighton, Sussex. The guide was the creation of John D. Stamford, a businessman born in St Helens, Lancashire, in 1939; he had apparently trained at one point to be a priest. Peter Burton (described as "the Godfather of Gay Journalism") later said that "When John D. Stamford founded Spartacus there was no gay press and although there were plenty of gay journalists, there was no gay journalism. Those of us who were involved from the very beginning had to find our material and learn to write about it in a style our readers would not have previously encountered."

In 1972, Stamford was convicted for sending obscene material in the post. One year previously, he had shifted operations to Amsterdam, Netherlands, reissuing the magazine under his new company Euro-Spartacus. During the following years, the magazine grew considerably, both in terms of size and sales figures, and became the most successful travel publication catering to gay men. By the late 1970s, Spartacus was receiving about 12,000 recommendation letters annually, and by 1982 it was speculated to have sold 250,000 copies. The magazine included translations in French, German, and Spanish. The guide included information on gay bars, bookstores, and saunas collected from reader tip-offs in various locales.

Spartacus was later accused of engaging in racial stereotyping and fetishisation of "scantily-clad, non-white youths in exotic settings" and promoting gay sex tourism for both adult and child prostitutes. Stamford wrote in his 1976 entry for the Philippines that "I found a place where homosexuality and bisexuality were accepted as a part of life, where friendly, smiling, happy people gave of themselves for the pleasure of their foreign guests", and that "we assure you of a holiday of a lifetime in this tremendous paradise and there are no laws governing homosexuality, sex with boys of all ages is quite legal." The 1979 Guide also repeated the claim. However, in April 1980, Stamford wrote an editorial entitled "The Rape of the Third World", which condemned the actions of a minority of Western gay sex tourists who behaved inappropriately with underage Filipino boys. Stamford said he felt guilty about unleashing a 'mighty flood' of wealthy paedophiles in the Philippines and urged readers to avoid the country as 12 gay visitors were murdered in 1979.

Stamford was also a firm supporter of the Paedophile Information Exchange (PIE), a British organisation founded in 1974 that aimed to promote paedophilia as a valid sexuality. As early as the 1976 (6th edition) of the Spartacus Guide, PIE were listed in the Great Britain section. Links with PIE remained close, even as PIE was shut down by the British authorities and its members arrested, and Stamford's support for the organisation and paedophilia more generally became more pronounced in the Guide in the following years:

- 1977 (7th edition) - this edition contained a listing for PIE within the UK section, stating that more information can be gleaned by writing to 'PIE c/o Spartacus'.
- 1978 (8th edition) - PIE remained listed in the UK section. The guide also contained an offer of holiday information (available upon request) specifically tailored for paedophiles.
- 1979 (9th edition) - PIE remained listed in the UK entry, noting that "due to police, press and general public harassment PIE has apparently gone underground. Its last known address was PIE, PO Box 318, London, SE3 8QD but there is strong suggestion that mail to that address is intercepted by the police or postal authorities, and it is therefore advisable not to write. It is known that police raided the homes of some PIE members and that they seized records including the mailing lists. PIE's magazine - Magpie - unexpectedly appeared in December 1978, several months late and much improved, but that could be a last-ditch stand against the evil pressures bearing on PIE. Spartacus sympathises with the paedophile problem and is continuously working to offer safe and reliable support for paedophiles, but we feel obliged to warn our paedophile readers around the world of the serious dangers which they risk in the UK - even by mail or association. Paedophile readers of this Guide are invited to write to Spartacus - we will try to at least partially fill the gap left by the problems imposed on PIE and other paedophile groups." The 1979 Guide also contained an advert for Spartacus' PAN (Paedo-Alert News) magazine, 'a magazine about boy-love', below which is stated "it has long been our position here at Spartacus that paedophiles are, in most of the Western World, a deeply misunderstood, disgracefully persecuted minority who need all the assistance the gay community can give them. We have designed PAN not only to help the boy-lover better understand himself, but to educate non-paedophiles on the realities of this form of sexuality, as it relates to both the paedophile and the child."
- 1980 (10th edition) - the UK section again listed PIE, stating that "the Thatcher government is spending enormous sums to eliminate this organisation from the face of the earth and jail everyone connected with it. The big show trial of PIE executive committee members should get underway next winter in the Old Bailey. Police have possession of the organisation's mailing list and are regularly raiding private residences of members. As a result, PIE has more or less gone underground. Anyone contacting this organisation should carefully think out beforehand his position vis-à-vis confrontation with the authorities. British paedophile readers of this Guide are invited to write to Spartacus. Our boy-love magazine PAN is a serious, English-language, non-pornographic magazine which has never had any difficulties with UK Customs and will be of interest to those who received Magpie, the magazine/newsletter PIE used to publish. We will try at least partially to fill the gap opened by the savage persecution of British paedophile organisations." The back of the magazine contained an advert for Spartacus' Holiday Help Portfolios; it is stated that "for boy-lovers we have prepared a special Paedophile Vacations Holiday Help Portfolio which gives a global overview of the situation with respect to paedophilia, age of consent, police practices etc. in every country the travelling boy-lover is likely to visit."
- 1981 (11th edition) - PIE was again listed in the UK section, reiterating Spartacus' opposition to their "savage persecution" and "the big show trial" of PIE members then underway. The advert for the Paedophile Vacations Holiday Help Portfolio was repeated, as was an advert for PAN magazine ("we use only non-erotic photos of good-looking kids"). This edition also contained an advert for PIE member Tom O'Carroll's book Paedophilia: The Radical Case.
- 1982 (12th edition) - in Stamford's introductory letter he attacks "the disgraceful prosecution of PIE in England, culminating in Tom O'Carroll's being thrown into solitary confinement." The edition contained an advert for PIE, and re-printed the adverts for Spartacus' Paedophile Vacations Holiday Help Portfolios and PAN magazine.
- 1983 (13th edition) - the adverts for PIE and the Paedophile Vacations Holiday Help Portfolios remain. The edition also features a colour section promoting Spartacus' Coltsfoot Press, a "publisher of fiction and scientific books about friendship, love and sexual relations between men and boys", which published titles such as An Asian Minor and Bom-Crioulo - the black man and the cabin boy, as well as O'Carroll's Paedophilia: A Radical Case and Panthologies - stories about boy-love. The PIE advert appeared for the final time in the 1984 (14th edition), though the Coltsfoot Press advert remained in both the 1984 and 1985 (15th edition) Guides.

By the mid-1980s Stamford and Spartacus were in severe difficulties. The Dutch tax office had raided Stamford's Baarn home in 1986 over alleged tax violations; as a result no Spartacus guide was released in 1986, and later that year the business was sold to the Berlin-based gay publisher Bruno Gmünder Verlag. Meanwhile, concern about the guide's use by paedophiles had been growing for some years; as early as 1981, the children's rights charity Terre des hommes had raised this issue. Spartacus had also been mentioned in connection with global paedophilia in a 1984 US Permanent Subcommittee on Investigations into Child Pornography and Paedophilia. In 1986, journalists with Britain's Sunday Times had travelled to the Philippines using one of the Spartacus Paedophile Vacations Holiday Help Portfolios, finding there a well-organised child prostitution ring.

=== Bruno Gmünder Verlag (1986–2017) ===
Bruno Gmünder began re-publishing the Spartacus International Gay Guide from 1987 (16th edition) onward. However it appears that Stamford remained involved with the magazine, with the Guide being edited by 'Bruno Gmünder & John D. Stamford' and containing an introductory letter from Stamford up until the 1993/94 (22nd edition) Guide. The pro-paedophilia content was significantly reduced though not eliminated altogether; for example, the advert for Spartacus' Paedophile Vacations Holiday Help Portfolios remained in the guide up until the 1989 (18th) edition, and the 1992/93 (21st edition) warns that in the Philippines "paedophiles however are not tolerated, and are well advised to stay away from the Philippines if they are planning an over-indulgent vacation surrounded by smooth, Philippines boys." Furthermore, a listing for a Copenhagen-based 'Paedophile Group' remained in the Guide right up until the 1994/95 (23rd) edition.

Stamford's name was dropped from the Guide as of the 1994/95 (23rd) edition, against a background of greater police action against paedophiles in the Netherlands and Belgium, prompting editor Helmut Ladwig in his opening preface to explicitly condemn paedophilia and any suggestion that Spartacus supported such activities ("Spartacus International Gay Guide has become the target of violent attacks in various media, particularly because of the business relations between John D. Stamford and the Bruno Gmünder Publishers on the one hand, and the misunderstanding concerning the Spartacus code 'YC' ['young crowd'] on the other... we consider that we must categorically refute all reproaches. The target of the attacks is indeed no longer just one publication... but the entire gay community, whereby the concepts 'homosexuality' and 'paedophilia' are mixed up in a way that is totally unreflected and merely designed to drum up sensation... Spartacus International Gay Guide is a guide for men who like men, not children."). A similar defence was included in the 97/98 edition. However no mention was made of the known links between Stamford and paedophile rings, and Spartacus' promotion of PIE and paedophilia for many years.

In November 1994, John D. Stamford went on trial at a local court in Turnhout, Belgium, for 'offending public morals and publicising sexual exploitation'; however, the case was then referred to a higher court in early 1995. The charges, which were brought by four Belgian children's rights organisations, were that the Spartacus Guide and the associated Spartacus Club had provided information enabling paedophiles to find children for sex in countries such as the Philippines, Thailand and Brazil. Stamford denied the charges, stating that they were motivated by homophobia. Stamford died of a heart attack later that year whilst still in custody awaiting trial. Bruno Gmünder continued publishing the Spartacus International Gay Guide annually, now shorn of all references to Stamford or paedophilia, until 2017.

=== GayGuide UG (2017–present) ===
Bruno Gmünder Verlag became insolvent in 2017, and the Spartacus brand was sold to Berlin-based GayGuide UG. GayGuide UG ceased publication of the print guide, focusing instead on the Spartacus app and website.

== See also ==
- Gay tourism
- International Gay and Lesbian Travel Association
- LGBT cruises
