= The Magnets =

British a cappella group

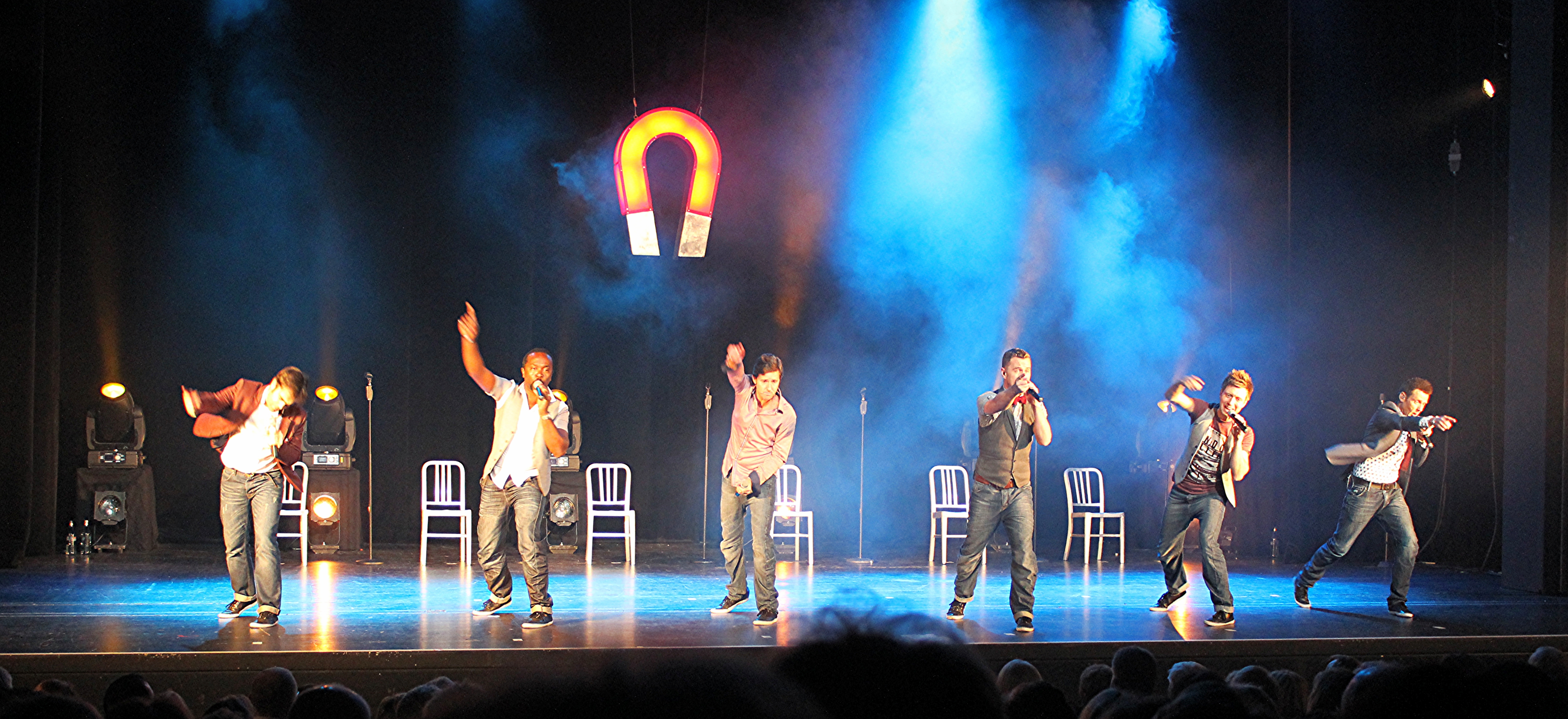
The Magnets performing in Gifhorn, Germany in November 2013

The Magnets are a British a cappella group, comprising Callum McIntosh, Michael Conway, Stevie Hutchinson, Ross Hunter, Eddie King and Mc Zani. Hobbit, Alfredo Austin III, Andres Cruz, Sam Pope and Aaron J Boykin also perform with the group. None of the original members are listed here. Nick Girard, writes the majority of the arrangements and also performs within the group. The group formed while at University College London together in a production of Guys and Dolls.

They signed to EMI and released their debut album,Giving It All That, in 2001. The following few years saw them tour with Lisa Stansfield, Michael Ball, Tom Jones and Geri Halliwell, with appearances on The Michael Parkinson Show, Blue Peter and GMTV. In 2004, the group released Another Place, which featured nine original songs and two covers, including a rendition of Stephen Stills' "For What It's Worth". Their next album, Gobsmacked, featured songs such as "Girls & Boys" originally by Blur (band), and "Sweet Dreams" by Beyoncé, as well as live favourites such as "Poker Face" by Lady Gaga and "Livin' on a Prayer" by Bon Jovi.

The band has performed in five years of the last eight at the Edinburgh Fringe Festival. The Magnets undertook a European tour in November and December 2010.

In June 2011, they performed in Adelaide, Australia, as part of the Adelaide Cabaret Festival. Following this, they toured Melbourne, Sydney and Noosa.

On 12 January 2014, the group played their first US date in New York City. In 2025, the band took up residency aboard the "Valiant Lady" Cruise ship (Virgin Voyages).

== Discography ==
=== Studio albums ===
Date	Title	Chart positions
Date	Title	UK
30 April 2001	Giving it All That: Debut studio album	-
1 May 2004	Another Place: Second studio album	-
2009	under the covers - Special Edition: Third studio album	-
20 September 2010	Gobsmacked: Fourth studio album	-
2013	All This Time: Fifth studio album	-
17 February 2017	Can You Feel It: Sixth studio album	-

=== EPs ===
Date	Title	Chart positions
Date	Title	UK
2002	Young Voices: Debut EP	-
26 March 2011	Human: Second EP	-
8 October 2012	Homegrown: Third EP	-

=== Singles ===
Date	Title	Chart positions	Album
Date	Title	UK	Album
20 November 2000	"How Deep"/"She's Not There"	No. 87	Giving It All That
16 April 2001	"All the Wrong Reasons"	No. 80	Giving It All That
14 June 2010	"Poker Face"	-	Gobsmacked
15 December 2011	"Walking in the Air"	-	Non album single
