= Rick Day =

American photographer

- Born: July 30, 1962 (age 63); Greenville, South Carolina, U.S.
- Occupation: Photographer
- Years active: 25
- Website: rickdaynyc.com

Rick Day (born July 30, 1962) is an American photographer based in New York City. His work concentrates on advertising photography and video.

== Biography ==
Day was born and raised in Greenville, South Carolina. He moved to Atlanta at the age of 18 and worked as a waiter and a DJ. After seeing a book of work by Bruce Weber, Day bought his first camera at the age of 28. As a self-taught photographer, he began shooting models in the Atlanta area before moving to Milan for a year. He later relocated to New York City in 1994 where he resides in the East Village with his two dogs.

== Career ==
All Players by Rick Day

Day's work is influenced by photographers Bruce Weber, Herb Ritts and Victor Skrebneski. His fashion spreads and images have been published in numerous publications including Elle, Details, Vogue Italia, Männer, DNA and GQ.

He has shot advertising campaigns for Goody's, Gap, Ritani and Rufskin. Celebrity subjects have included performers such as Liza Minnelli and Taylor Swift, athletes such as Floyd Mayweather, and other public figures such as Michael Strahan, Nigel Barker, Fabien Cousteau, and Robert Sepúlveda Jr.

Day published his first coffee table book, Players, in 2008. His second book, Pioneers, released in 2010, debuted at number one on the Amazon.com best-selling erotic book list. Players Two was published in 2011, and All Players was released in 2012. To date, all of Day's books have been released through publisher Bruno Gmünder Verlag.

In 2015, he contributed photographs for Kevin Clarke's The Art of Looking: The Life and Treasures of Collector Charles Leslie. The same year he co-directed his first music video for New York-based singer-songwriter AYER.

== Bibliography ==
- Players – Bruno Gmünder Verlag 2008
- Pioneers – Bruno Gmünder Verlag 2010
- Players Two – Bruno Gmünder Verlag 2011, ISBN 978-3-86787-142-6
- All Players – Bruno Gmünder Verlag 2012, ISBN 978-3-86787-420-5
