= Brilliant Lady =

Virgian Voyages cruise ship

- Brilliant Lady, docked in Prince Rupert, B.C. on August 8, 2026

History

Bahamas
- Owner: Virgin Voyages
- Operator: Virgin Voyages
- Builder: Fincantieri, Sestri Ponente, Italy
- Yard number: 6304
- Launched: 25 November 2022
- In service: 5 September 2025
- Identification: IMO number: 9870654; MMSI number: 311001167
- Status: In service

General characteristics
- Tonnage: 110,000
- Length: 277 m (908 ft 10 in)
- Beam: 38 m (124 ft 8 in)
- Draught: 8 m (26 ft 3 in)
- Decks: 17
- Capacity: 2,770

Briliant Lady is a cruise ship operated by Virgin Voyages.

== History ==
In 2018, Virgin Cruises ordered a fourth ship from Fincantieri, Sestri Ponente, Italy to the same design as Scarlet Lady, Valiant Lady, and Resilient Lady. It has accommodation for 2,770 passengers. It operates adults only cruises.

Launched in November 2022, Brilliant Lady entered service on 5 September 2025 after delays caused by material shortages.

Brilliant Lady is the only Lady-class ship to differ substantively from her sisters. A slightly larger pool was fitted following sailor feedback, as well as arrangement changes to certain venues. Lifeboat derricks have been lowered and hoisted inward to fit restrictions for Panama Canal crossings, enabling access to the west coast of the US and notably Alaska. Because of these changes, the limited view balcony categories have been replaced with ones offering slightly smaller terraces.
