= Queer Destinations =

Mexican travel and tourism company

- Company type: Private
- Industry: Travel
- Headquarters: Mexico City, Mexico
- Website: queerdestinations.com

Queer Destinations is a travel and tourism company based in Mexico City, Mexico, that focuses on LGBTQ+ related travel and tourism.

== Overview ==
The company focuses on developing international LGBTQ+ tourism. It also provides certification lists of destinations, hotels, and services, considering them to be "QD certified" if they meet certain standards for international LGBTQ+ tourists. The company collaborates closely with the International LGBTQ+ Travel Association to develop LGBTQ+ tourism throughout the Spanish-speaking world, particularly in Mexico.

Queer Destinations focuses on destinations throughout Mexico, including Oaxaca, Yucatán, Morelos, Mexico City, Los Cabos, Guadalajara, and many other parts of Mexico. Edgar Weggelaar is currently the CEO of the company.
