= List of ship launches in 2022 =

This is a chronological list of some ships launched in 2022.

Date	Ship	Class / type	Builder	Location	Country	Notes
5 January	Richard M. McCool Jr.	San Antonio-class amphibious transport dock	Ingalls Shipbuilding	Pascagoula, Mississippi	United States	For United States Navy.
7 January	Thun Britain	NaabsaMax coastal tanker	Ferus Smit	Leer	Germany	For Thun Tankers A.B., Sweden
2 February	YOT-02	Oil tanker	Shin Kurushima Hashihama Dockyard	Hashihama	Japan	For Japan Maritime Self-Defense Force
11 February	Disney Wish	Triton-class cruise ship	Meyer Werft	Papenburg	Germany	For Disney Cruise Line
11 February	Carnival Celebration	XL-class cruise ship	Meyer Turku	Turku	Finland	For Carnival Cruise Line
11 February	SH Vega	Vega-class cruise ship	Helsinki Shipyard	Helsinki	Finland	For Swan Hellenic
26 March	Arklow Coast	General cargo ship	Ferus Smit	Westerbroek	Netherlands	For Arklow Shipping
March	Viking Mississippi	River cruise ship	Edison Chouest Offshore’s LaShip shipyard	Houma, Louisiana	United States	For Viking River Cruises
22 April	Nordic Crystal	General cargo ship	Ferus Smit	Leer	Germany	For Erik Thun AB
29 April	Jacques Chevallier	Bâtiment ravitailleur de forces	Chantiers de l’Atlantique	Saint-Nazaire	France	For French Navy
30 May	Explora I	Explora-class cruise ship	Fincantieri	Monfalcone	Italy	For MSC Cruises
14 June	Manxman	Ferry	Hyundai Mipo Dockyard	Ulsan	South Korea	For Isle of Man Steam Packet Company.
16 June	Tennor Ocean	Ro-Ro cargo ship	FSG	Flensburg	Germany	For Tennor Holding
23 June	Viking Saturn	Venice-class cruise ship	Fincantieri	Ancona	Italy	For Viking Ocean Cruises
25 June	Scenic Eclipse II	Cruise ship	Uljanik shipyard	Pula	Croatia	For Scenic Group
2 August	Norwegian Viva	Project Leonardo	Fincantieri	Marghera	Italy	For Norwegian Cruise Line
27 August	Arvia	XL-class cruise ship	Meyer Werft	Papenburg	Germany	For P&O Cruises
November	Brilliant Lady	Cruise ship	Fincantieri	Sestri Ponente	Italy	For Virgin Voyages
1 December	Moby Legacy	Passenger/Ro-Ro ferry	GSI Shipyard	Guangzhou	China	For Moby Lines
3 December	Glasgow	Anti-Submarine Warfare Frigate	BAE Systems Naval Ships	Govan	United Kingdom	For Royal Navy
9 December	Icon of the Seas	Icon-class cruise ship	Meyer Turku	Turku	Finland	For Royal Caribbean International
30 December	Finncanopus	Passenger Ro-Ro ferry	China Merchants Jinling Shipyard	Weihai	China	For Finnlines
