= Resilient Lady =

Cruise ship owned and operated by Virgin Voyages

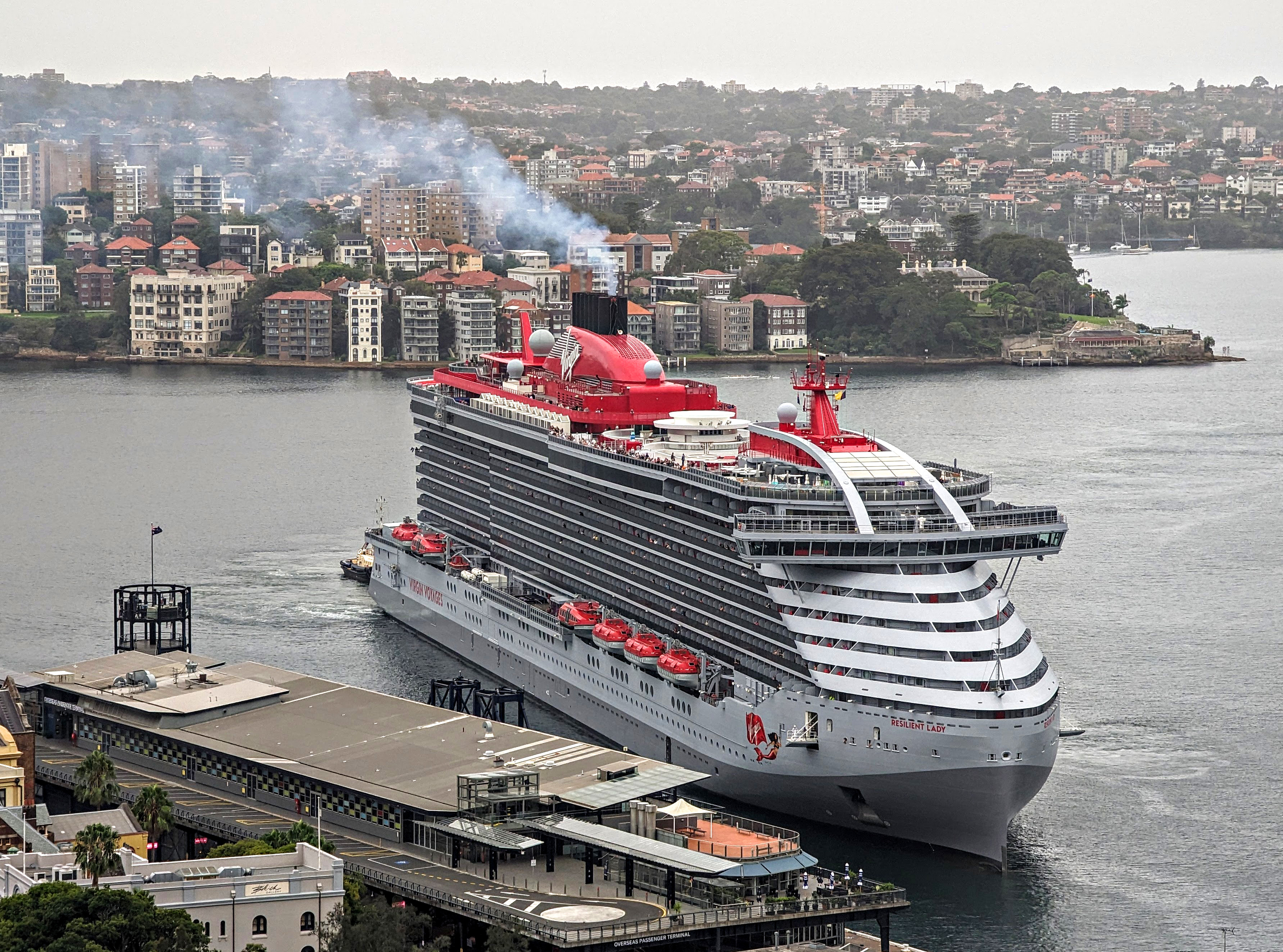
- Resilient Lady arrived in Sydney, New South Wales, Australia on 3 February 2024

History

Bahamas
- Name: Resilient Lady
- Owner: Virgin Voyages
- Operator: Virgin Voyages
- Builder: Fincantieri; Sestri Ponente, Italy
- Laid down: 27 April 2017
- Launched: 2 July 2021
- Completed: 8 December 2022
- Maiden voyage: 14 May 2023
- Identification: IMO number: 9805348; MMSI number: 311001056
- Status: In Service

General characteristics
- Tonnage: 110,000 GT
- Length: 278 m (912 ft)
- Beam: 38 m (125 ft)
- Draught: 8.05 m (26.4 ft)
- Decks: 17 total; 13 passenger decks
- Installed power: 2 × Wärtsilä 8L46F Diesel generators producing 9,600 kW (12,900 hp) each; 2 × Wärtsilä 12V46F Diesel generators producing 14,400 kW (19,300 hp) each; Total Installed Power: 48,000 kW (64,000 hp)
- Propulsion: 2 × 16,000 kW (21,000 hp) ABB Azipod units
- Speed: Service speed: 20 knots (37 km/h; 23 mph); Maximum: 22 knots (41 km/h; 25 mph)
- Capacity: 2,770
- Crew: 1,160

Resilient Lady is a cruise ship that is operated by Virgin Voyages. At 110,000 GT and measuring 278 metres (912 ft) long for a capacity of 2,770 passengers, she was built with similar proportions to her older sisters Scarlet Lady and Valiant Lady.

== History ==
The ship had her maiden voyage on 14 May 2023. Her first voyage took place in the eastern Mediterranean Sea. The ship sailed out for cruises in Australia, New Zealand and the Pacific Ocean across late 2023 to early 2024. In April 2024, the ship visited Fremantle for the first time. In July and August, she sailed from the eastern hemisphere to the United Kingdom for her inaugural UK season sailing from Portsmouth to Europe and North Africa.

Steph Bridge who is head of a family of champion kitesurfers had worked with Richard Branson on a number of record breaking attempts so in 2024 she was able to get his agreement for someone to kitesurf off Resilient Lady. They would be sixteen floors up. They would need to fly through the air and to land in the sea after falling 50 metres. It was her 23-year-old son, Tom Bridge, who carried out the stunt spending 40 seconds in the air. Kitesurfing from a height was not an established sport, so Tom achieved a first.

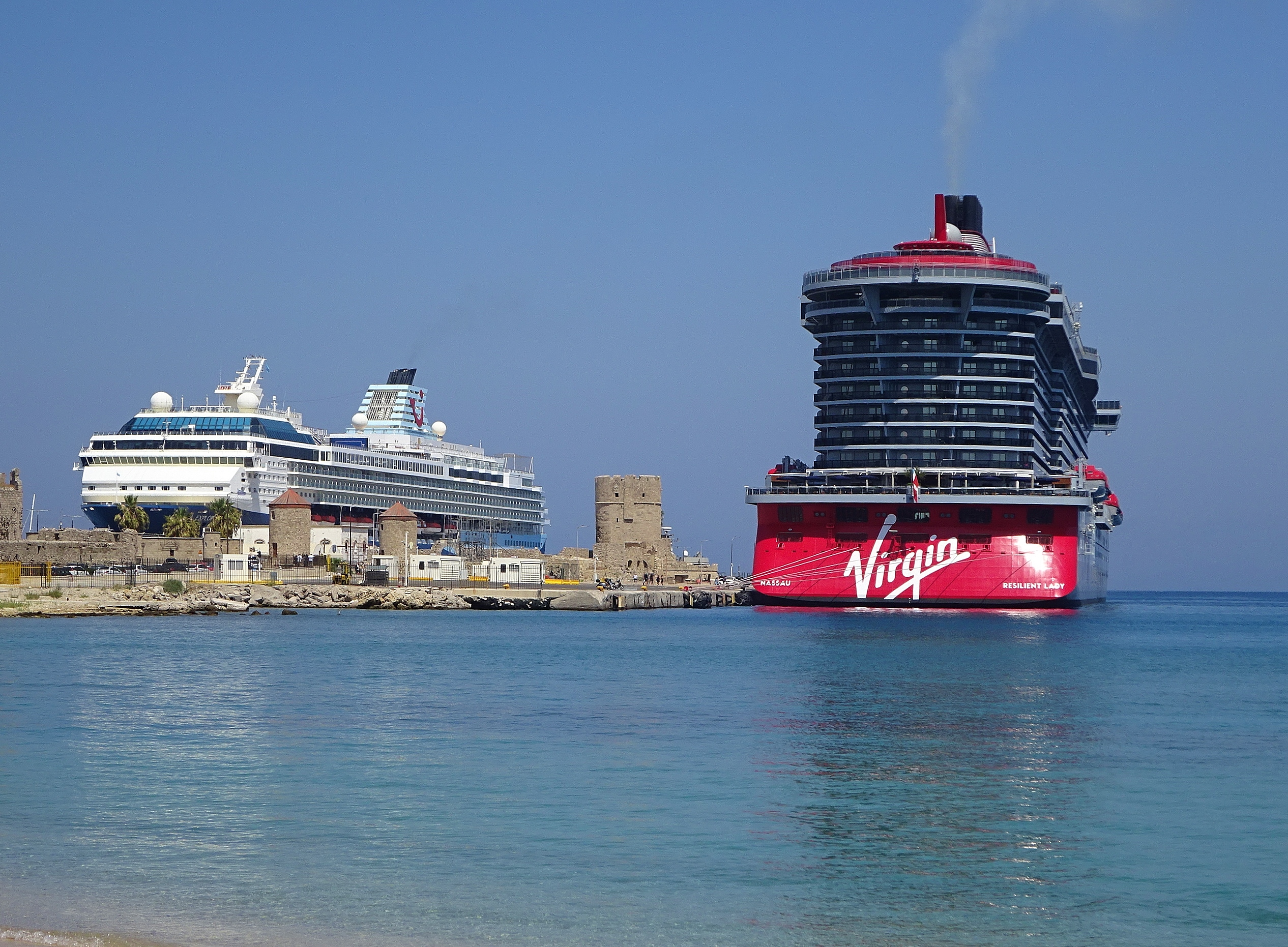
Resilient Lady docked in Port of Rhodes in Greece with Marella Explorer on 22 August 2023

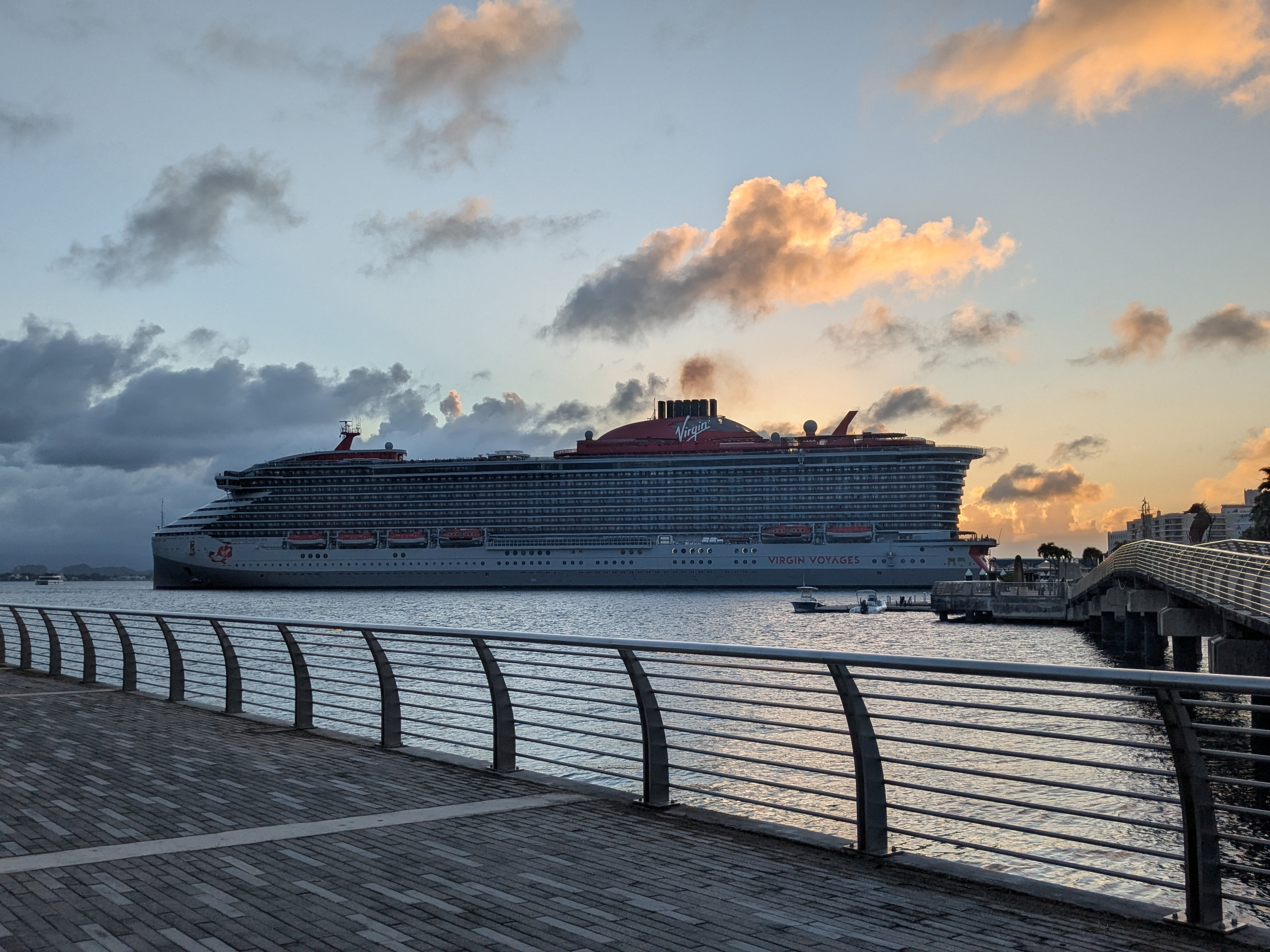
Resilient Lady docked in Puerto Rico on 8 February 2025
