= Lesbian tourism =

Lesbian tourism may refer to:

- LGBT tourism, a form of tourism marketed to lesbian, gay, bisexual, and transgender (LGBT) people
- Lesbos#Tourism, tourism on the Greek island of Lesbos
