= OutThere =

British LGBTQ travel magazine

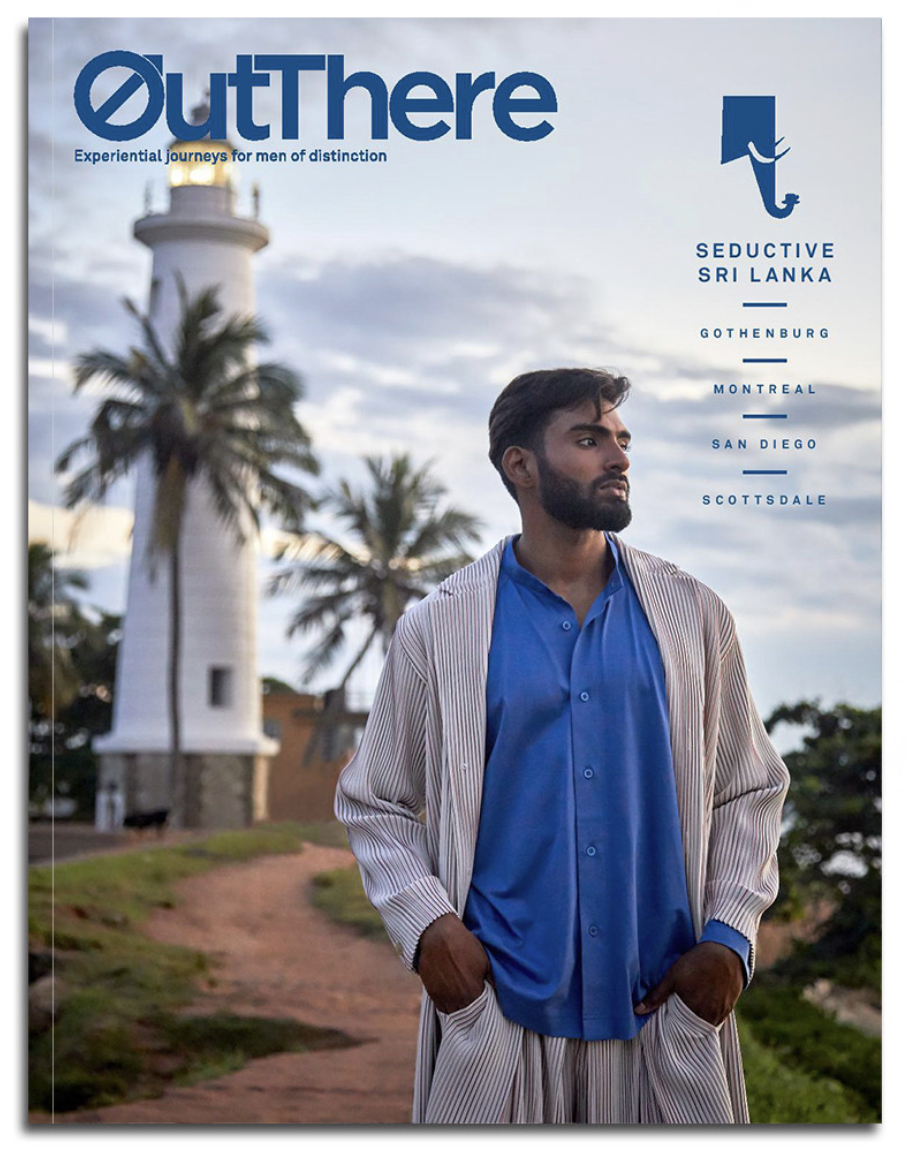
- OutThere Seductive Sri Lanka Issue (Winter 2019/29 cover)
- Categories: Luxury travel, Travel, LGBTQ
- Frequency: Quarterly in print, daily for online
- Publisher: OutThere Publishing Ltd
- Total circulation (2020): 66,000
- Founded: 2010; 15 years ago
- Country: United Kingdom
- Based in: London, England
- Language: English
- Website: OutThere.travel
- ISSN: 2633-0539

OutThere magazine is a luxury travel magazine and an independent media brand, founded in 2010 by Uwern Jong and Martin Perry. OutThere's content is distributed across a number of platforms, primarily its quarterly printed magazine and also on its website and social channels.

== Content and distribution ==
OutThere is published quarterly in the United Kingdom by Out There Publishing, and includes luxury travel reviews, news, features and style. OutThere is also available online. It describes its content as rooted in "diversity, discovery and discernment".

OutThere is a media-partner and member of the International LGBTQ+ Travel Association (IGLTA), the global travel trade association for LGBTQ+ tourism. The magazine's Editor-in-Chief, Uwern Jong, serves on the IGLTA board.

== Other activities ==
Since 2018, the magazine has run the LGBT+ Travel Symposium, an event series to educate travel brands to embrace diversity and be more welcoming of LGBTQ+ audiences. The series started in 2018 in Bangkok, Thailand with the backing of the Tourism Authority of Thailand, and it was the first ever event of its kind in South East Asia. It also runs the event in Stockholm, Sweden.

The publishers also run the Thai government's "Go Thai Be Free" LGBTQ+ campaign. In 2021, the magazine founded the Experientialist Awards to "recognise brands who champion creativity, innovation, resilience and stewardship in the luxury travel sector".

== Impact ==
Suitcase Magazine called OutThere magazine an "essential resource for LGBTQ+ travellers". Mark Bonham said that, as a publisher, it was a "material player in the advancement of LGBTQ rights". It was billed by the Gordon Institute of Business Science as a "leading luxury and experiential travel magazine for gay men."

=== Awards ===
The magazine has won a number of publishing awards. In 2013, the magazine took the Professional Publishers Association Independent Publishers Award for Relaunch of the Year. In 2018, OutThere won the Travel Media Awards for "Consumer Publication of the Year: Online" against notable and well established media, the BBC, Lonely Planet, The Daily Telegraph.

In 2020, the magazine was the recipient of the Professional Publishers Association's Independent Publishers Award's inaugural "Diversity Initiative of the Year" award, alongside Vogue. It also won the 2020 Campaign magazine Publishing Awards for "Editorial Leader of the Year: Consumer Publishing" against and alongside some of the UK's biggest publishing brands.
