= Virgin Voyager =

Virgin Voyager may refer to:

- British Rail Class 220, train known as the Virgin Voyager when operated by Virgin Trains
- British Rail Class 221, train known as the Virgin Super Voyager when operated by Virgin Trains
- Virgin Voyages, cruise line operator
