= Uwern Jong =

British entrepreneur

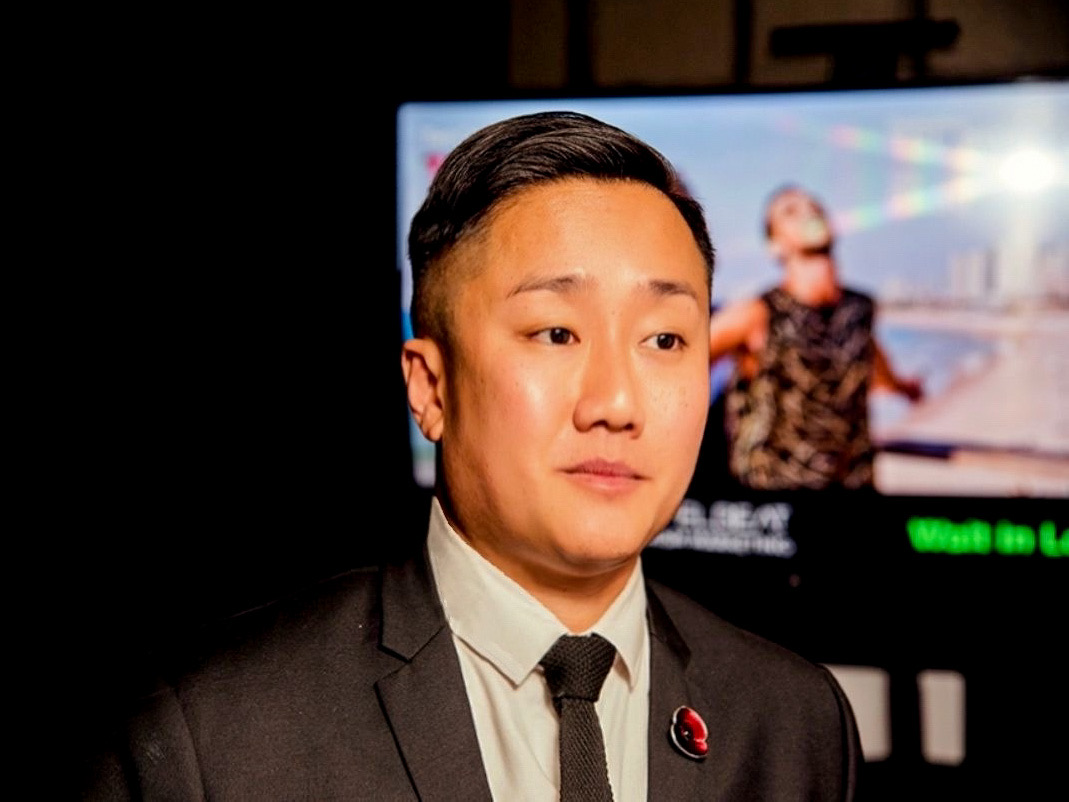
- Occupations: Editor-in-Chief, OutThere
- Known for: Global diversity, equality and inclusion advocate; founder of travel media company; inclusive tourism campaigner

Uwern Jong is a British Asian entrepreneur, journalist, editor and inclusive-tourism advocate. Jong co-founded OutThere magazine in 2010.

He is an inclusive tourism advocate, promoting a more diverse media landscape and better recruitment and representation in the travel industry. In 2024, he launched Icons of Inclusion, a luxury travel industry event with a focus on diversity, accessibility and inclusion in tourism.

Jong is also founder of Southeast Asia’s first LGBTQ+ travel symposium for the Tourism Authority of Thailand and through OutThere, developed Thailand's “Go Thai Be Free” LGBTQ travel campaign and website, as part as the government’s strategy to attract more diverse tourists to the country. The event has since been hosted in other destinations, including Stockholm, Sweden, Los Cabos, Mexico and Basque Country, Spain.

Jong is credited as an Editor who has been a "material player in the advancement of LGBTQ+ rights.”

== Career ==
Jong was one of the original founders of integrated marketing and communications agency, Intelligent Marketing where he created marketing campaigns targeting the LGBTQ+ market

Jong continues to campaign for inclusive tourism for the LGBTQ+ community and until 2023, was board-member of the International LGBTQ+ Travel Association.

== Awards and recognitions ==
- TravMedia Awards 2025 – "Luxury travel writer of the year."
- Walpole Power List 2025 and 2022 – "The 50 most influential people in British Luxury."
- The United States Travel and Tourism Administration's IPW Award 2023 and 2017 that recognises travel journalists who have made a significant contribution to the promotion of the United States of America as a travel destination, worldwide.
- TTG Travel Industry Awards 2022 – “Diversity Trailblazer of the year.”
- Attitude 101, 2021 – "10 LGBTQ trailblazers breaking barriers in the travel industry."
- Campaign Magazine's "Campaign Publishing Awards" for Editorial Leader of the Year – Consumer Publishing, 2020.
- GNETWORK360 Masterclass Award for Excellence in Journalism 2020 that recognises the contribution of international journalists for their work in promoting Argentina as an inclusive destination for travellers.
