= Gaylocator =

Travel guide

GAYLOCATOR ®
- Website type: Geosocial networking
- Available in: English
- Headquarters: Prague, Czech Republic
- Area served: EU
- Creator: Global Production s.r.o.
- Website: gaylocator.com
- Registration: Yes
- Current status: Active

Gaylocator, stylized as GAYLOCATOR, is a travel guide aimed toward gay travellers to Europe. The guide is updated annually by Global Productions, based in Prague.

== See also ==
- Gay tourism
- International Gay and Lesbian Travel Association
- LGBT cruises
