= Oriol Pamies =

Spanish LGBT entertainer and activist

- Born: October 17, 1989 (age 37); Reus, Catalonia, Spain
- Citizenship: Spain
- Occupations: Spanish entrepreneur and LGBT activist
- Known for: LGBT activism and co-founder of Moovz, an LGBT social network

Oriol Pamies (born October 17, 1989) is a Spanish entrepreneur, LGBT activist and co-founder of LGBTQ+ social network, Moovz and Queer Destinations.

== Early life ==
Pamies was born in Reus, Catalonia. In 2008, he moved to Barcelona for his studies, which he dropped when he started to pursue his entrepreneurial career.

In 2012, following an invitation from Idan Matalon, Pamies travelled to Israel to explore new business opportunities.

== Career ==
Pamies joined the Israeli start-up Interacting Technology as their VP Business Development becoming one of the founders of Moovz, an LGBT social network. While in Israel he became an active member of the local LGBT and tech community. Through Moovz, Pamies works to position tourist destinations as LGBT friendly. In 2015 and through a partnership with Tel Aviv Municipality, he was behind a project that broadcast through the app the Tel Aviv Pride Parade. In 2016, he advocated and promoted Israel through an interview at the Spanish magazine Shangay. In May 2017, during the annual convention of International Gay and Lesbian Travel Association (IGLTA) in St. Petersburg, Florida, he delivered the first keynote in Spanish. In September 2017 in Bogotá, he took part at the International Congress of Social Mobility and Right to the city, organised by the City Hall, where he presented a case study on how the Gay Pride Parade can contribute at the positioning and International promotion of a city as an LGBT friendly destination. He was involved in the failed project Open Sea Cruise, an LGBTQ+ event from Dreamlines and Spanish hotel chain Axel Hotels on a cruise ship with over 1200 people from more than 54 countries joined by artists like Icona Pop, Vengaboys, Kazaky, Eleni Foureira, Conchita Wurst, and RuPaul. The cruise was focused on wellness, fitness and pop music parties and visited cities like Ibiza, Barcelona, Toulon and Ajaccio. In 2019, he founded Queer Destinations, a company focused on the promotion of LGBTQ+ tourism, developing an international tourism certification. The IGLTA and Queer Destinations signed an agreement with the Secretary of Tourism, Miguel Torruco Marqués, to promote the tourist promotion oriented to the LGBTI segment in Mexico. That same year, Pamies also developed and launched an LGBT tourism pilot program in Mexico, initially running the program in Yucatán state.

== LGBT activism ==
In 2016, Pamies partnered with YouTuber Julio Jaramillo and Juana Martinez in a campaign to defend diversity and tolerance. In 2017, Pamies led Moovz to become the official social network of Madrid World Pride 2017 2017. Pamies has taken part in various conferences, presenting topics related to entrepreneurship, online marketing and activism. From 2018-2024 Pamies was on the board of directors of the International Gay and Lesbian Travel Association (IGLTA), a non-profit organization with 37 years of history dedicated to promoting LGBTQ+ tourism worldwide.

== Publications ==
In 2019, Pamies published his first book, Ahora Que Ya Lo Sabes (Now You Know) with Diana/Grupo Planeta, which describes his personal story though while dealing with topics as orientation, identity, and gender expression, prejudice, homophobia, acceptance, the process of coming out of the closet, and activism., to help readers make decisions, and to let those who are suffering for being different come to recognize that they are perfect just as they are.It was presented at the 2019 Madrid Pride.

== Personal life ==
Pamies is gay. He had spent most of his adolescent years studying at an Opus Dei school, but left when he started to question his sexuality and decided to come out as gay at the age of 19. As a result, Pamies has been a strong promoter of October 11 as National Coming Out Day.
