= LGBTQ cruises =

Cruises with LGBT+ theme

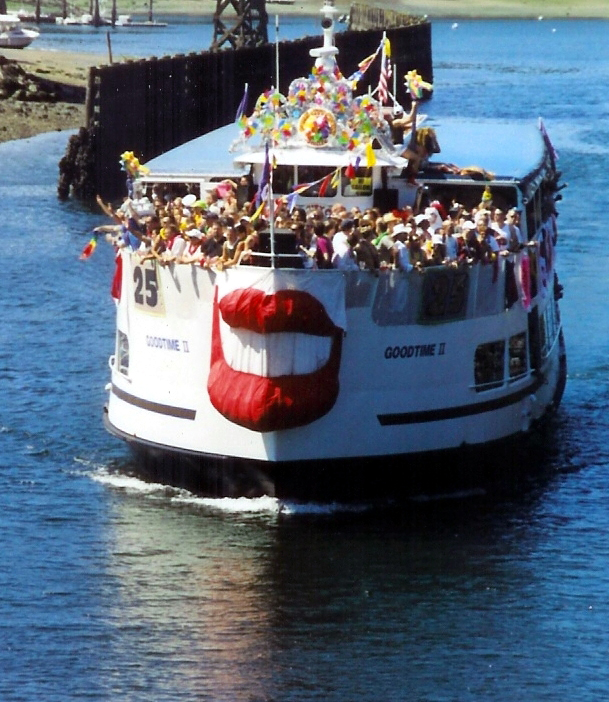

LGBTQ cruises are a rising phenomenon in LGBTQ culture and a growing trend in the LGBTQ tourism industry. LGBTQ cruises typically consist of cruises oriented towards gay men or lesbians.

== History ==
As LGBTQ tourism began to expand more into LGBTQ society as a new cultural phenomenon, LGBTQ cruises became a growing trend. Before the start of all-gay cruises, gay couples would go on predominantly straight cruises, then later on had small LGBTQ groups aboard on mainstream cruises. Now, the LGBTQ cruising phenomenon has expanded in scale, resulting in the establishment of all-gay or all-lesbian cruises. It contributes a great deal the LGBTQ tourism, as the demand of gay and lesbian cruising companies and itineraries increased 68% between 2010-2020.

Some of the major LGBTQ cruising companies were established in the 1990s. Currently, there are over 15 U.S. companies that specifically specialize in LGBTQ cruising and over 75 itineraries. The LGBTQ cruises are preferred by gays and lesbians of all ages, as can be seen in the variation of age groups, from 20s up to 60s, 70s, and even 80s. It is said by Rich Campbell, the president and chief executive of Atlantis Events, that the average age out of 2,000 passengers on one of the cruises was around 40.

== People on LGBTQ cruises and their behaviors ==
=== Customers ===
Generally, passengers allowed on LGBTQ cruises must be at least 18 years old. If guests are within the age of 18 to 21, they must travel with a passenger over 25 years old in the same cabin. Family oriented cruises allow LGBT parents to sail with their children.

==== Customer behavior (reasons in choosing LGBTQ cruises) ====
There are few reasons in which the LGBTQ travelers choose LGBTQ cruises. First, they have opportunities to spend their vacation in a more LGBTQ-friendly environment, as they consider being in the atmosphere as a more significant factor than the destinations. Second, LGBTQ people can be themselves in LGBTQ cruises with suitable security, atmosphere, and camaraderie, because they find that it is different from their daily lives of feeling stressful and constrained by the heterosexual environment. Third, the LGBTQ travelers can make other LGBTQ friends during the vacation. Fourth, the staff are friendly, polite, respectful and welcoming to its LGBTQ passengers.

LGBTQ couples with children trend to join the LGBTQ cruises because being in a gay-friendly environment is an important factor to them. Since they have their children to care for, the homosexual parents would be conscious about how others treat their families as it could be effective on their children. Moreover, LGBTQ parents would actually consider the destinations of the cruises, in which the trip could be both family-friendly and gay-friendly.

It is said that LGBTQ cruises will become a bigger trend in the coming future as the homosexual marriage are legalized in many countries, such as Canada and the Netherlands and the United States of America.

== Routes and destinations ==
There are various routes for LGBTQ travelers to choose from, as more gay travel companies and agencies are organizing LGBTQ cruises to build up LGBTQ tourism. Some itineraries are the same as heterosexual cruises, including popular tourist destinations such as the Caribbean. However, LGBTQ-friendly destinations are common on LGBTQ cruises, which are called gay "hotspots", such as Mykonos or Ibiza in the Mediterranean Sea. These areas are common destinations for homosexual travelers, especially during the summer. Major cultural capitals such as Barcelona or Rome may also be popular destinations due to their concentration of nightlife and dining. Though the Caribbeans is a typical destination for most cruises, gay-friendly cities like the Dutch Antilles (Aruba, Bonaire and Curaçao) would be specifically preferred by LGBT travelers.

== Pricing and promotion strategies ==
Compared to the mainstream cruises, LGBTQ cruises are more expensive. This may be due to the extra onboard parties and entertainers for the services and entertainment on the cruises. The main promotion strategy used by LGBT cruise companies is the Internet.

== Controversy surrounding the LGBTQ cruises ==
LGBTQ cruises sometimes cause issues due to the association between negative stereotypes about gay people and negative behaviors caused by drunk passengers. There are also problems when LGBT cruises port on countries that are not generous or acceptable about homosexuality. For example, the Caribbean government refused to allow LGBT cruises to land on their islands in the late 1990s, a ban which still exists to this day. In addition, some residents of ports may be unhappy when the LGBT travelers show physical affection in public. In Roseau, Dominica, in 2012, 2 gay men on a cruise were arrested while in a port for having sex.

== See also ==
- LGBTQ tourism
- LGBTQ marketing
- Spartacus International Gay Guide
- Gaylocator
