= Tom McAlpin =

American businessman

- Born: 1959 (age 66–67)
- Education: Florida State University (BA); University of Miami (MBA)
- Occupations: CEO and President, Virgin Voyages
- Spouse: Yvonne McAlpin

Thomas Michael McAlpin (born 1959 in Miami, Florida) is the Chairman and former CEO of Virgin Voyages. He previously served as president and CEO of The World, a privately owned residential ship. McAlpin also served as president of Disney Cruises, where he oversaw two cruise ships, the Disney Magic and Disney Wonder as well as Disney's private island Castaway Cay.

== Early life and education ==
McAlpin was born in Miami, Florida in 1959. He earned his bachelor's degree in Accounting and Finance from Florida State University and a master's degree in Business Administration from the University of Miami.

== Career ==
In 1981, McAlpin began his career as a senior auditor for KPMG and in 1984 became the chief financial officer for the CSB Leasing Group. In 1986, he joined Royal Caribbean Cruises, Ltd. as director of Corporate Planning and Analysis and held this position for eight years.

McAlpin joined Disney Cruises as part of the founding management team in 1995 as vice president of finance, business development and shore-side travel operations. During the creation of Disney Cruises, he was responsible for planning the first two ships and negotiating the contracts for Castaway Cay. McAlpin was with the company for 14 years and served as president for the final five years of his tenure.

In July 2009, McAlpin joined ResidenSea, Ltd., the company responsible for the condo cruise ship, The World, as president and chief executive. During his five years with the company McAlpin oversaw an $11 million renovation of the ship. He resigned from his role at The World and joined Virgin Cruises as president and CEO in 2014.

== Other activities ==
McAlpin is a member of the Florida State University Foundation Board of Trustees. He was previously a member of the national board of the Make-A-Wish Foundation and the chairman in 2012.
