= Bruno's (German company) =

Bruno's GmBH
- Trade name: Brunos
- Founder: Bruno Gmünder
- Headquarters: Berlin, Germany
- Number of locations: 4
- Website: brunos.de

Bruno's GmbH (Bruno Gmünder GmbH) was a Berlin media company founded in 1981 as Bruno Gmünder Verlag. The German company produced media and products targeted toward gay men. Originally a book publishing house, the firm became a global market leader in the development of materials that supported gay self-confidence and lifestyle. The firm received majority ownership by Bruno Gmünder until 2011.

After filing for bankruptcy in 2014, the firm was restructured and purchased again by the lawyer Frank Zahn with Bruno Gmünder as a minority shareholder.

Bruno Gmünder Verlag was dissolved in 2017, with the retail division becoming the fashion and adult-toy vendor Bruno's and the publishing division sold to the publishing company Salzgeber & Co Medien GmbH in September 2018.

== History ==
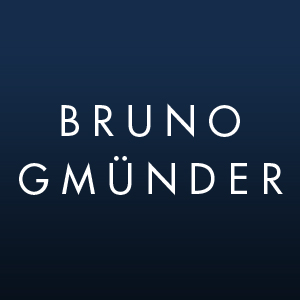
Final logo as Bruno Gmünder Verlag

The Bruno publishing house was founded in 1981 by co-founders Bruno Gmünder and Christian von Maltzahn. Prior to its creation, Gmünder had joined the Eisenherz bookshop, an entity opened with the help of Christian von Maltzahn in November 1978 in Berlin. The two friends founded the publishing house under the motto:

"Wir sind homo, wir machen homo und wir wollen dem Homo zum Buch verhelfen."

The company philosophy, as it appears in the magazine Männer, states that the publishing house was never created to make books that educate about homosexuality, but rather to create the media that homosexual readers lack.

The publishing house was best known for Männer, a gay male lifestyle magazine, and the Spartacus International Gay Guide, the world's best-selling travel guidebook for gay men. Bruno Gmünder had purchased the latter in 1986 following difficulties under the former owner John D. Stamford,, both financial and related to evidence that the Guide was sometimes being used by paedophiles to abuse children in developing countries. Under Bruno Gmünder the Guide significantly reduced the pro-paedophilia content, though arguably various aspects remained during the period 1987–1994.

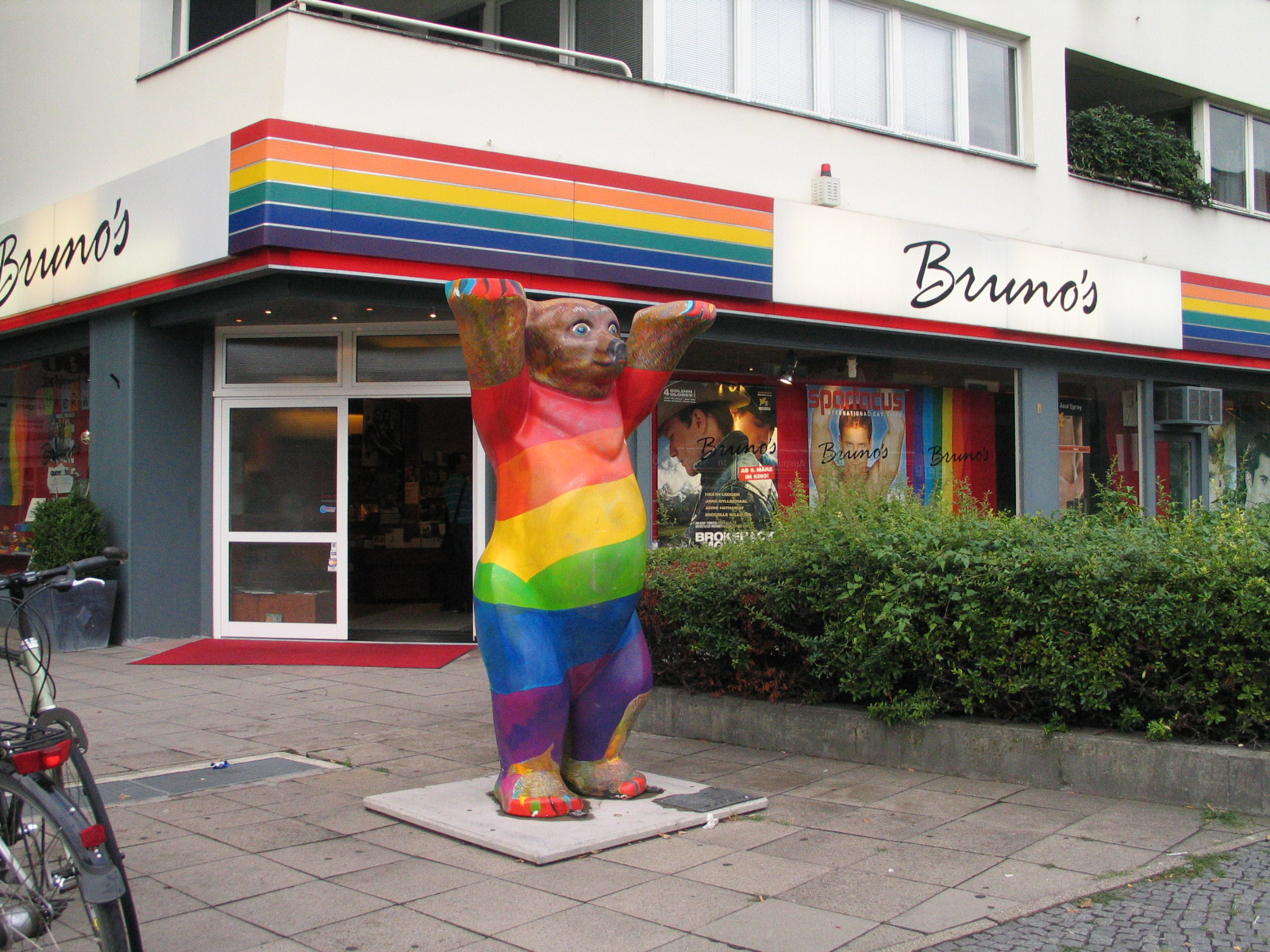
Bruno's retail store in Berlin, 2006

In October 2012, the Bruno Gmünder Group offered a "bounty" of €15,000 for information leading to the investigation and final conviction of the operators of the right-wing extremist and homophobic blog kreuz.net, a secretive renegade group falsely claiming to represent Catholic teaching. The Roman Catholic theologian David Berger took over the coordination of the resulting campaign "Stoppt kreuz.net". In a 2012 letter to the German Bishops' Conference, Berger's group asked them to support the campaign.. The German Bishops' Conference refused, but Austrian and Swiss bishops did subsequently throw their support behind Berger's initiative.

The Bruno's company declared bankruptcy in 2014, but was purchased by private investor Frank Zahn. When Zahn died unexpectedly in February 2017 the company again declared bankruptcy. The retail division and four retail outlets became Bruno's GmbH, while the publishing arm was acquired by Salzgeber in 2018 and merged into Männerschwarm Verlag.

== Criticism ==
=== Deutsche AIDS-Hilfe (German AIDS Help) ===
In December 2014, following allegations that posts (later removed) by David Berger, the Catholic theologian and editor-in-chief of the Bruno Gmünder Verlag periodical "Männer", had minimized the Holocaust, the organization Deutsche AIDS-Hilfe (DAH) saw fit to cancel their advertising campaign with the magazine. At first the publishing house defended Berger, a stance that prompted strong criticism from the website queer.de. On February 1, 2015, however, Berger was dismissed without notice.
