= Männer (magazine) =

German LGBT magazine

- Cover of the January 2012 edition
- Editor: Kevin Clarke (2012)
- Frequency: Monthly
- Circulation: 24,000 (2007)
- First issue: 1987
- Final issue: March 2017
- Company: Bruno Gmünder Verlag
- Country: Germany
- Based in: Berlin
- Language: German
- Website: m-maenner.de

Männer was a German lifestyle magazine for lesbian, gay, bisexual, and transgender people, published by the German company Bruno Gmünder Verlag. Between 1989 and 2007, the magazine was published as Männer aktuell.

== History ==
The magazine was established in 1987. Notable writers (present and past) are Kevin Clarke, Peter Rehberg, Frank Herrmann, Jürgen Bienieck, Thilo Keller. The last issue of Männer appeared in March 2017.

From 2011 to 2013, its editor was musicologist Kevin Clarke. From 2013 to 2015, it was the theologian David Berger. At the end of 2014, the AIDS association Aids-Hilfe denounced Berger's discriminatory remarks in the pages of Männer.
