= Costa Careyes, Jalisco =

Private community in Jalisco, Mexico

Costa Careyes is a private community located on the south coast of Jalisco, Mexico, on Highway 200 Melaque - Puerto Vallarta at kilometer 53.

There are several beaches in the Careyes Bay. Teopa Beach is the largest and includes a sea turtle preservation sanctuary.

The community was founded in 1968 by Gian Franco Brignone as his private estate. The castles, villas, casitas, bungalows and restaurants that comprise Careyes today function as a resort and have the "Careyes Style" of architecture.

It hosts the annual ArteCareyes Film and Arts Festival each spring.
