= Scarlet Lady =

Cruise ship

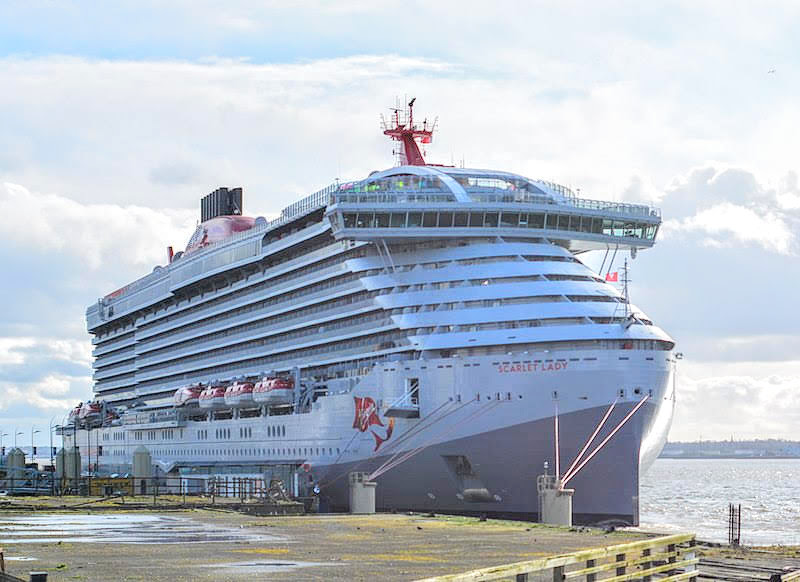
- Scarlet Lady at Liverpool in February 2020

History

Bahamas
- Name: Scarlet Lady
- Namesake: G-VRED Airbus A340-600
- Owner: Virgin Voyages
- Operator: Virgin Voyages
- Port of registry: Nassau, Bahamas
- Ordered: 23 June 2015
- Builder: Fincantieri (Sestri Ponente)
- Yard number: 6287
- Laid down: 31 October 2017
- Launched: 8 February 2019
- Christened: 21 February 2020
- Completed: 13 February 2020
- Acquired: 14 February 2020
- Maiden voyage: 14 February 2020
- In service: 2020-present
- Identification: Call sign: C6DX2; IMO number: 9804801; MMSI number: 311000807
- Status: In Service

General characteristics
- Tonnage: 110,000 GT
- Length: 277.2 m (909 ft 5 in)
- Beam: 38 m (124 ft 8 in)
- Draught: 8.05 m (26 ft 5 in)
- Decks: 17 total; 13 passenger decks
- Installed power: 2 × Wärtsilä 8L46F diesel generators producing 9,600 kW (12,900 hp) each; 2 × Wärtsilä 12V46F diesel generators producing 14,400 kW (19,300 hp) each; Total installed power: 48,000 kW (64,000 hp)
- Propulsion: 2 × 16,000 kW (21,000 hp) ABB Azipod units
- Speed: Service speed: 20 knots (37 km/h; 23 mph); Maximum: 22 knots (41 km/h; 25 mph)
- Capacity: 2,770
- Crew: 1,160

Scarlet Lady is a cruise ship owned and privately operated by Virgin Voyages. She is the inaugural ship for the cruise line and was delivered on 14 February 2020 by Italian shipbuilder Fincantieri. The 110,000 gross tonnage (GT) vessel was initially set to begin operating on 1 April 2020 but the COVID-19 pandemic postponed her official debut until 6 October 2021, after which she sailed her inaugural voyage to the Bahamas from her homeport of PortMiami. In accordance with Virgin Voyages's business model, Scarlet Lady operates exclusively as an "adults-only" ship for guests aged 18 and over.

== Construction and career ==
=== Planning ===
On 4 December 2014, Virgin Group founder Richard Branson announced Virgin Group would be forming a new cruise line with the backing of Bain Capital named Virgin Cruises and revealed initial plans to begin with two new cruise ships.

On 23 June 2015, Virgin Cruises announced that it signed a letter of intent with Italian shipbuilder Fincantieri for three cruise ships that could each accommodate approximately 2,800 guests and 1,150 crew for seven-day Caribbean voyages. The three-ship order reportedly cost $2.55 billion, with the first ship scheduled to begin operating in 2020. The order's contract was formally signed on 18 October 2016, the same day Virgin Cruises rebranded as Virgin Voyages in a bid to distinguish itself within the industry.

On 20 July 2018, Virgin Voyages revealed the name of the first ship as Scarlet Lady, in honor of the second plane of sister brand Virgin Atlantic.

=== Construction and delivery ===
Temporarily billed as Virgin I and known in the shipyard as "hull number 6287", Virgin's first ship had her steel-cutting ceremony at Fincantieri's shipyard in Sestri Ponente on 22 March 2017. On 31 October 2017, construction formally began with the laying of the ship's keel. Nine months later, the dock was flooded on 20 July 2018 for the first time to allow two hull sections to be connected. Altogether, the ship was assembled from 399 sections. On 8 February 2019, Scarlet Lady was floated out from the shipyard, after which interior outfitting work commenced. In November 2019, Scarlet Lady performed her two rounds of sea trials. She set off from Genoa to Marseille between 15 November and 18 November and sailed in the opposite direction for her second round between 27 November and 30 November.

Scarlet Lady was completed and presented by Fincantieri on 13 February 2020 and formally delivered on 14 February 2020 in Sestri Ponente. Branson christened the vessel in Dover on 21 February 2020 during an industry visit for the ship, but formal naming festivities were scheduled for 19 March 2020 in her homeport of PortMiami, which were curtailed due to the COVID-19 pandemic. In March 2022, Virgin announced American singer Jennifer Lopez would become an investor and the brand's "chief entertainment and lifestyle officer", thus making her the informal godmother to Scarlet Lady and her fleetmates.

=== Debut ===
Amid the pandemic and the cruise industry's broader hiatus, the ship's debut schedule and inaugural festivities were significantly impacted. Following her delivery, Scarlet Lady began by hosting media and travel industry representatives on stops in Dover and Liverpool before continuing on her re-positioning voyage to the United States. Virgin had prepared preview events in New York City, but was forced to cancel them due to the pandemic so the ship sailed directly to Miami instead. Upon her arrival in Miami, Scarlet Lady had been scheduled to perform two pre-inaugural voyages in late-March 2020. Her first was scheduled from 26 to 29 March and her second from 29 March to 1 April. Both three-night sailings would embark from Miami and visit Virgin's new private island resort, The Beach Club at Bimini, located on the Bimini islands in the Bahamas.

On 12 March 2020, Virgin announced an initial postponement of the ship's inaugural season, with the pre-inaugural sailings slated to begin on 15 July 2020, but these were cancelled in May 2020. She had also been scheduled to sail her maiden voyage on 1 April 2020, visiting Key West and Bimini, but this would later be postponed to 7 August 2020. Numerous debut timeframe adjustments for Scarlet Lady followed before Virgin decided to send the ship to Portsmouth, England to perform a limited summer 2021 season in the United Kingdom designed as a "preview"; from 6 August 2021, she operated six short sailings that varied between two and four nights-long and had enforced capacity restrictions for fully vaccinated British guests.

In September 2021, Scarlet Lady sailed to New York for the ship's travel industry preview events that were initially curtailed in 2020 and on 6 October 2021, 18 months later than planned, Scarlet Lady set sail on her inaugural voyage from Miami for Nassau and Bimini.

=== Deployments ===
On 23 June 2015, Branson initially announced the first three ships in the fleet would be based at PortMiami for week-long, round-trip Caribbean itineraries, with the first ship beginning operations in 2020. In January 2019, Virgin released the first details of Scarlet Lady's itineraries with revisions from earlier plans. She was now scheduled to sail shorter itineraries, ranging from four to five nights round-trip from Miami to the Caribbean and visiting various ports including Havana, Puerto Plata, and Costa Maya, in addition to Bimini.

In June 2019, in response to the United States's government re-instituted ban on passengers from entering Cuba via passenger and recreational vessels, Virgin swapped out all visits to Havana with calls to Key West, Florida and also added a fourth itinerary option to visit Cozumel on five-night sailings, along with two seven-night holiday sailings to Puerto Plata and San Juan, Puerto Rico.

== Design and concept ==
=== Adults-only ===
On 31 October 2017, Branson and president and CEO of Virgin Voyages, Tom McAlpin, revealed that the company's first ship would be exclusive to adults, requiring that all guests be ages 18 and over. McAlpin explained that this move was made to appeal largely to travel professionals within the more premium market looking for an "elevated" experience. Chief Commercial Officer of Virgin Voyages, Nirmal Saverimuttu, also attributed the decision to the company's aim to target "people who would not typically consider a cruise holiday" and might be interested in a "cooler" and more "intimate" setting.

=== Offerings ===
On Scarlet Lady, Virgin Voyages bundles all passengers' fares as one price per cabin, as opposed to pricing each voyage per guest. Consequently, prices appear higher than those of Virgin's competitors. Virgin explained that all fares would cover dining charges, fitness classes, internet access, and gratuities, among other offerings, but expenses incurred from alcoholic beverages, retail, and shore excursions would be charged separately.

The ship does not include any buffet or dining rooms, and instead, houses approximately 20 different dining and drinking establishments. Other venues include a multi-function theater and an onboard tattoo and body piercing parlor.

=== Technology and specifications ===
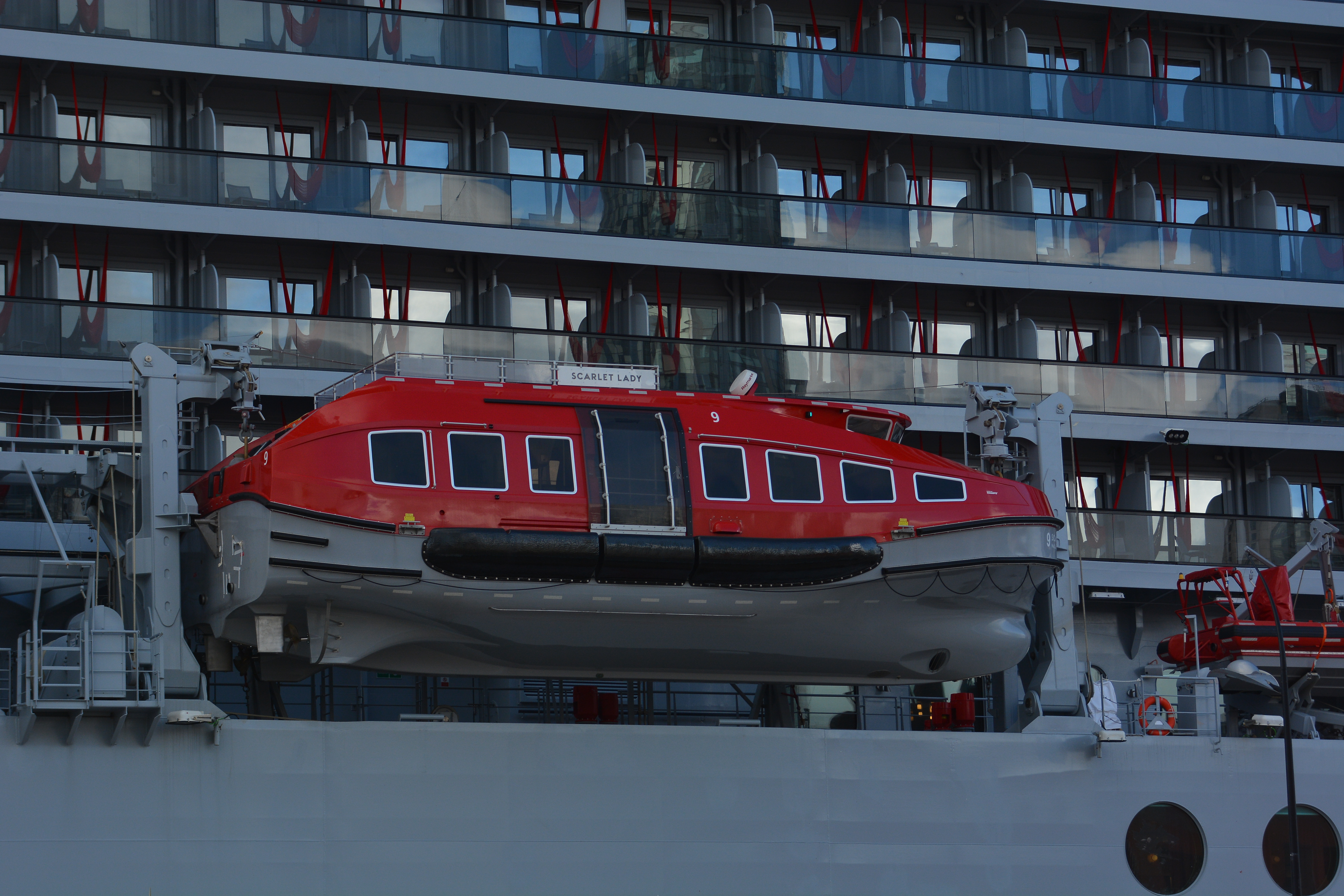
A lifeboat tender on Scarlet Lady

Scarlet Lady has a total of 1,408 passenger cabins and 813 crew cabins for a maximum capacity of 4,400 passengers and crew, which can accommodate over 2,770 passengers and 1,160 crew. Of the 1,408 passenger cabins, there are 78 suites, 1,030 balcony cabins, 95 window cabins, and 105 inside cabins. She is equipped with balconies on 86% of her cabins, with 93% of the cabins featuring an outside view. The ship's livery consists of a silver hull, red funnel, and tinted windows, and also includes the Virgin "mermaid guide" figure featured on sister brands, Virgin Atlantic and Virgin America.

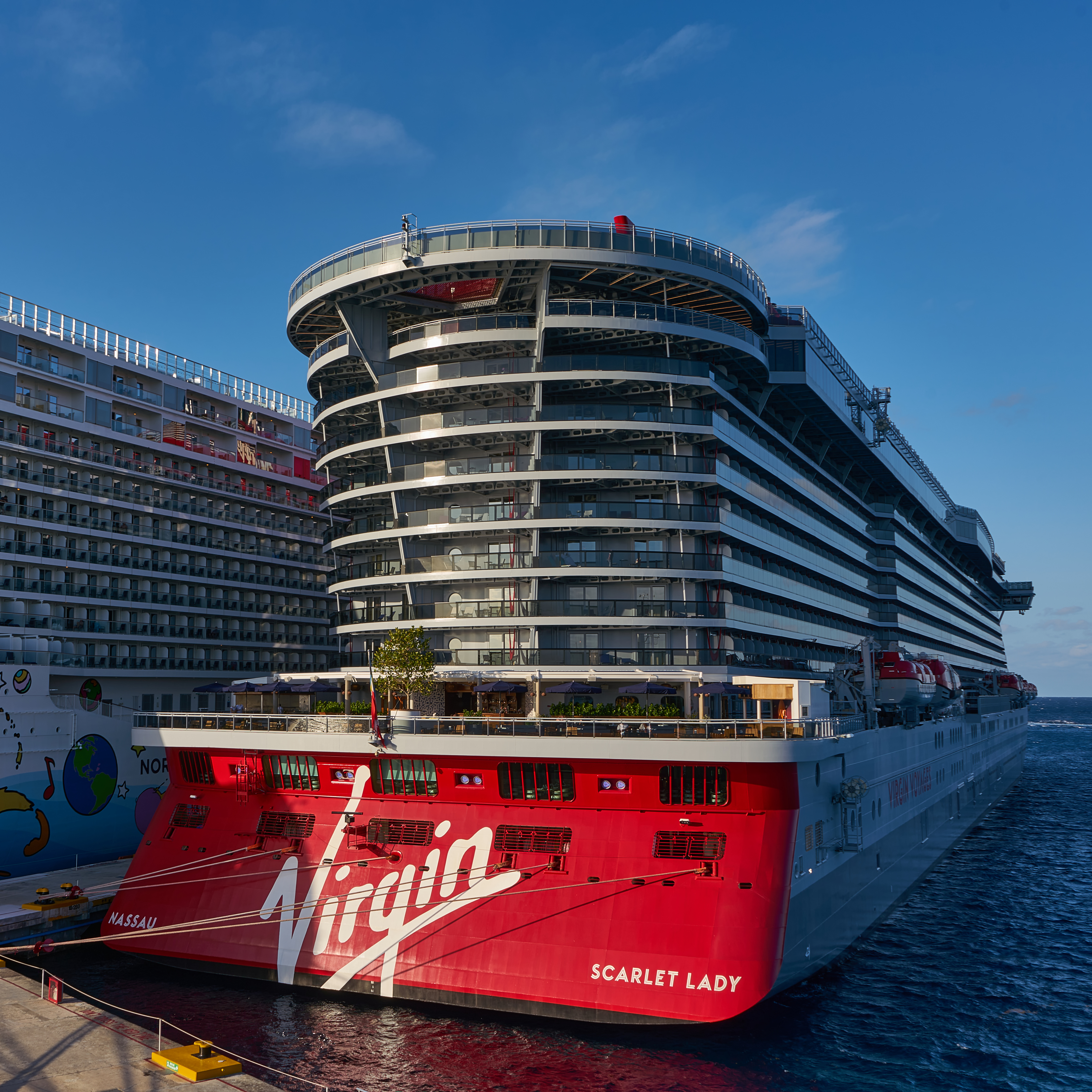
Stern of Scarlet Lady

Scarlet Lady has 17 decks, a length of 277.2 metres (909 ft 5 in), a draft of 8.05 metres (26 ft 5 in), and a beam of 41 metres (134 ft 6 in). She is powered by a diesel-electric genset system, with four Wärtsilä engines, producing 48 megawatts (64,000 hp). Main propulsion is via two ABB Azipod XO units, having a combined power output of 32MW (43,000hp). The system gives the vessel a service speed of 20 knots (37 km/h; 23 mph) and a maximum speed of 22 knots (41 km/h; 25 mph). Wärtsilä also provided the ship's navigation systems, a hybrid scrubber system to remove sulfur dioxide from the exhaust, and a selective catalytic reduction system to reduce nitrogen oxide emissions. The ship partially produces her own energy through a 1 megawatt (1,300 hp) production system that uses the waste heat from her diesel engines.

In February 2021, it was announced that Scarlet Lady would be equipped with satellite internet connectivity from SES using the O3b medium Earth orbit satellites to provide passengers with free ultra-fast, low-latency onboard wi-fi internet access.

== Incidents and accidents ==
=== 2020 crew member death ===
On 22 May 2020, it was reported that a 32-year-old male Filipino crew member of Scarlet Lady had been found dead in his cabin. Virgin Voyages confirmed the man's death was not related to the coronavirus, and the United States Coast Guard confirmed that he had died from "apparent self-harm." Scarlet Lady sailed into PortMiami later that day, where the body was disembarked.

=== 2026 incident in Turkey and Egypt ===
In July 2026, Scarlet Lady, chartered by Atlantis Events for a gay pride voyage, was denied entry to ports in Turkey and Egypt. The ship was initially denied entry to the ports of Kuşadası and Istanbul in Turkey, with local authorities citing "moral values" as the reason for the blockade. Subsequently, the ship faced a similar denial of entry when attempting to dock in Egypt, marking an unprecedented situation for the cruise organizer, which has operated such voyages for 25 years.
