= Valiant Lady (ship) =

Cruise ship owned and operated by Virgin Voyages

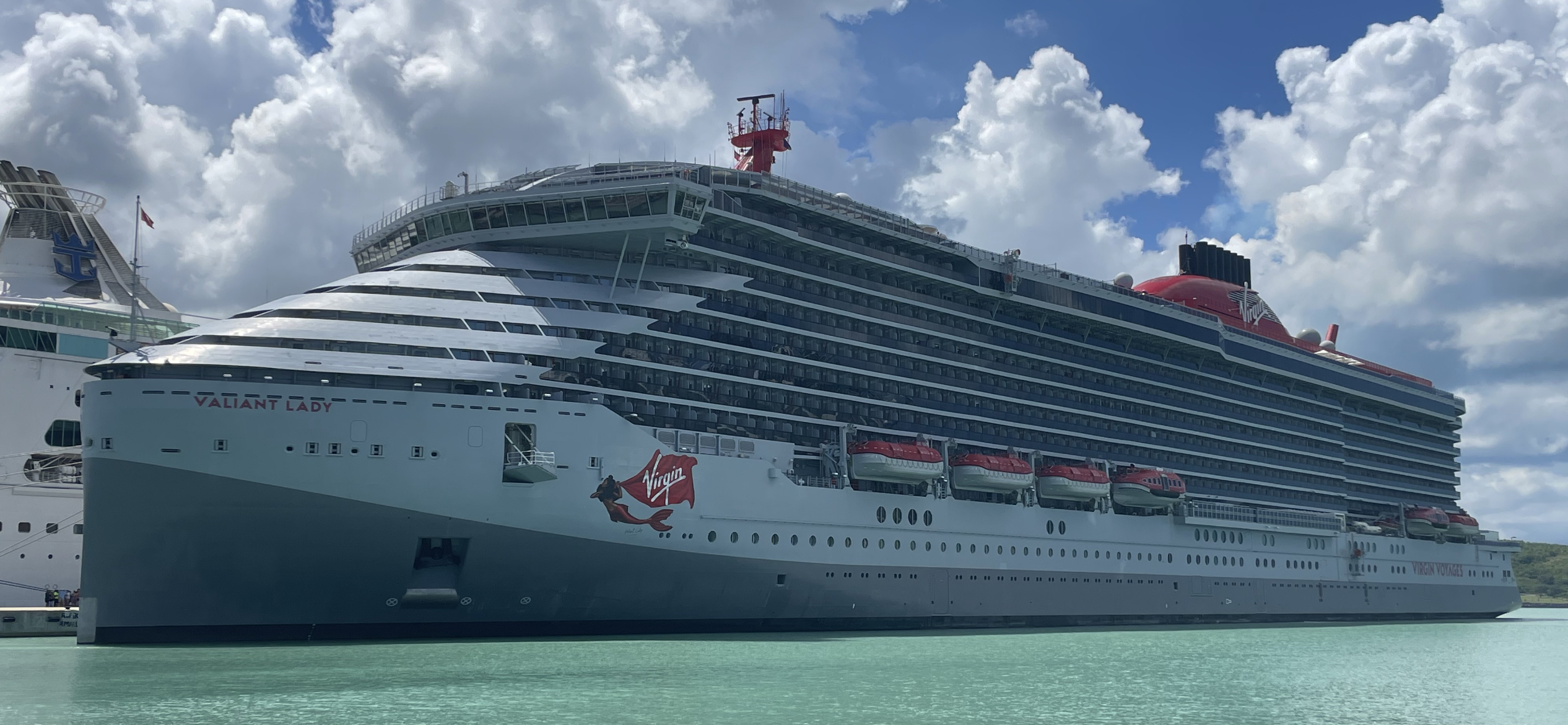
- Valiant Lady in Antigua, 2024

History

Bahamas
- Name: Valiant Lady
- Owner: Virgin Voyages
- Operator: Virgin Voyages
- Builder: Fincantieri; Sestri Ponente, Italy
- Laid down: 8 February 2019
- Launched: 20 May 2020
- Acquired: 1 July 2021
- Maiden voyage: 18 March 2022
- Identification: IMO number: 9805336
- Status: In Service

General characteristics
- Tonnage: 110,000 GT
- Length: 278 m (912 ft)
- Beam: 38 m (125 ft)
- Draught: 8.05 m (26.4 ft)
- Decks: 17 total; 13 passenger decks
- Installed power: 2 × Wärtsilä 8L46F Diesel generators producing 9,600 kW (12,900 hp) each; 2 × Wärtsilä 12V46F Diesel generators producing 14,400 kW (19,300 hp) each; Total Installed Power: 48,000 kW (64,000 hp)
- Propulsion: 2 × 16,000 kW (21,000 hp) ABB Azipod units
- Speed: 20 knots (37 km/h; 23 mph) (service speed); 22 knots (41 km/h; 25 mph) (maximum speed)
- Capacity: 2,770
- Crew: 1,160

Valiant Lady is a cruise ship operated by Virgin Voyages. After she was ordered in October 2016 with Italian shipbuilder Fincantieri, her coin ceremony was held in February 2019 and she was floated out in May 2020 from the shipyard in Sestri Ponente. She was delivered to Virgin in July 2021 as the fleet's second vessel and sailed her maiden voyage in March 2022 from Portsmouth. At 110,000 GT and measuring 278 metres (912 ft) long for a capacity of 2,770 passengers, she was built with similar proportions to older sister ship Scarlet Lady.

== Construction and career ==
=== Planning and construction ===
On 4 December 2014, Virgin Group founder Richard Branson announced that Virgin Group was forming Virgin Cruises, together with the backing of Bain Capital, and revealed plans to build two new cruise ships. On 23 June 2015, Virgin Cruises announced that it signed a letter of intent with Italian shipbuilder Fincantieri for three cruise ships that could each accommodate approximately 2,800 guests and 1,150 crew for seven-day Caribbean voyages. The three-ship order reportedly cost US$2.55 billion, with the second ship scheduled to begin operating in 2021. The order's contract for the ships was formally signed on 18 October 2016, the same day Virgin Cruises rebranded as Virgin Voyages. In joining her sister ship, initial details revealed she would measure 110,000 GT, 278 metres (912 ft) long, and 38 metres (125 ft) wide, with 1,400 passenger cabins to house up to approximately 2,700 passengers, accompanied by 1,150 crew members.

On 20 July 2018, Virgin inaugurated the construction for its second ship with the ship's steel-cutting ceremony at Fincantieri's shipyard in Sestri Ponente. The ship's coin ceremony was performed on 8 February 2019. On 19 November 2019, Virgin revealed the name of its second ship as Valiant Lady. During the COVID-19 pandemic, construction delays arose after Fincantieri's operations were suspended. Originally expected to be floated out in March 2020, Valiant Lady was floated out from her dry dock two months behind schedule, on 20 May 2020, and was moved to a new berth to complete her outfitting work. The ship was delivered on 1 July 2021.

=== Operational career ===
Valiant Lady entered service on 18 March 2022, sailing a three night cruise from Portsmouth, England to Zeebrugge, Belgium. She continued sailing from Portsmouth with itineraries visiting Belgium, Spain, Portugal and the Canary Islands before repositioning to the Mediterranean in summer 2022. From May 2022, she sailed from Barcelona to destinations in Italy, Spain, Gibraltar and France. She then repositioned to Miami, Florida in October 2022 to operate cruises to the Caribbean over the winter, before returning to the Mediterranean in summer 2023.

During a cruise in the Atlantic Ocean in April 2023, a young woman fell off a balcony and fell on another person. The former died from her injuries.

March 2024 sees the Valiant Lady playing host to the first ever WPT Voyage, a 1-week charter full ship takeover by the World Poker Tour.
