= Virgin Voyages =

Cruise line based in Florida

V Cruises US, LLC

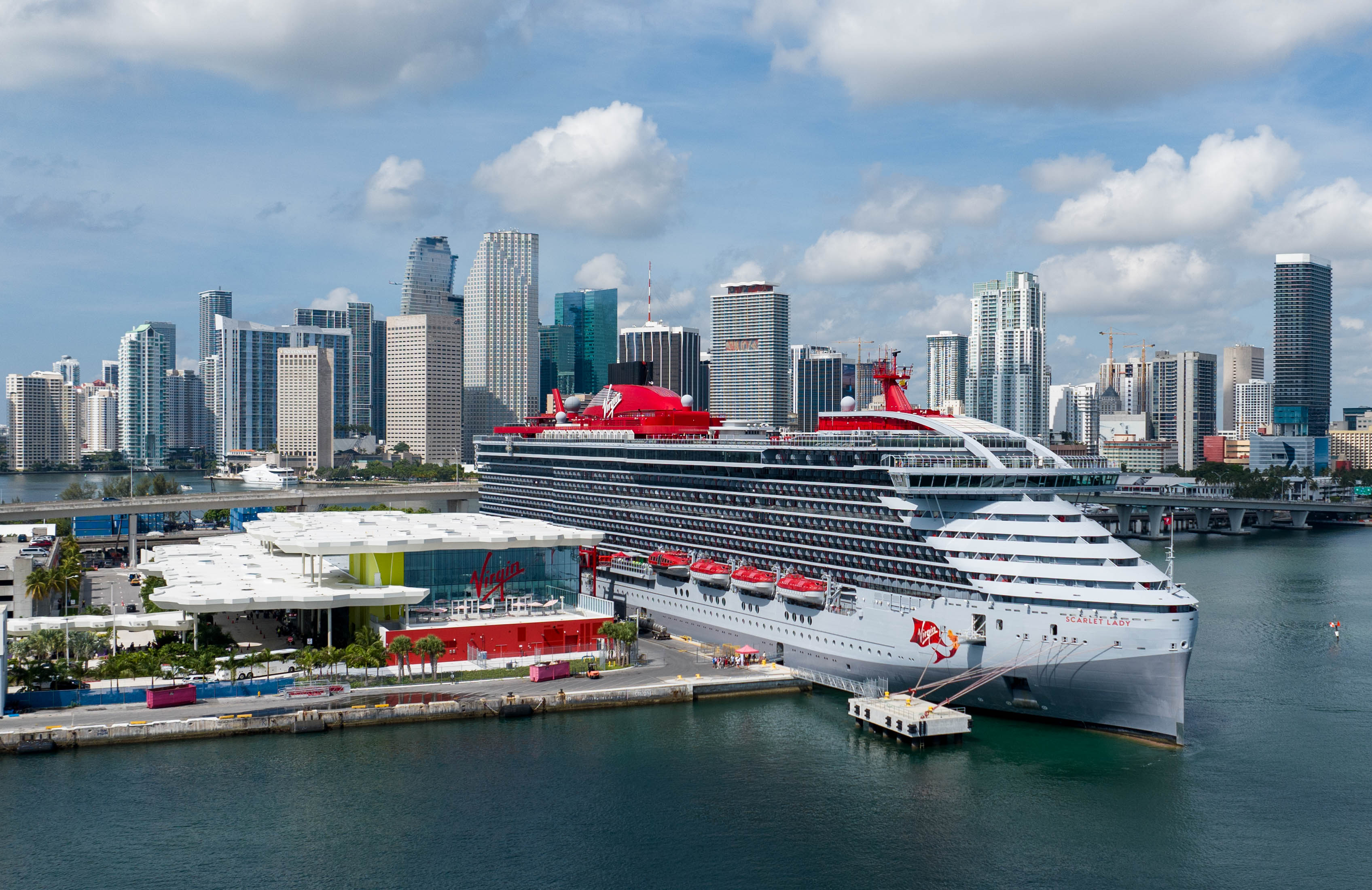
- Virgin Voyages Terminal V and the Scarlet Lady ship in PortMiami
- Trade name: Virgin Voyages
- Formerly: Virgin Cruises
- Type: LLC Subsidiary
- Industry: Tourism
- Founded: December 4, 2014; 11 years ago
- Headquarters: Plantation, Florida, U.S.
- Key people: Tom McAlpin; (Chairman); Nirmal Saverimuttu; (President & CEO)
- Products: Cruises
- Parent: Virgin Group; Bain Capital (majority)
- Website: virginvoyages.com

Virgin Voyages is a cruise line headquartered in Plantation, Florida and a joint venture between the Virgin Group and Bain Capital.

As of September 2025, Virgin Voyages has four ships in the fleet, all with an expected capacity of approximately 2,700 passengers each. The first ship, Scarlet Lady, began sailing August 6, 2021 from Portsmouth with UK only itineraries. Scarlet Lady began operating from PortMiami in October 2021, sailing mainly four-to-five night cruises in the Caribbean.

== History ==
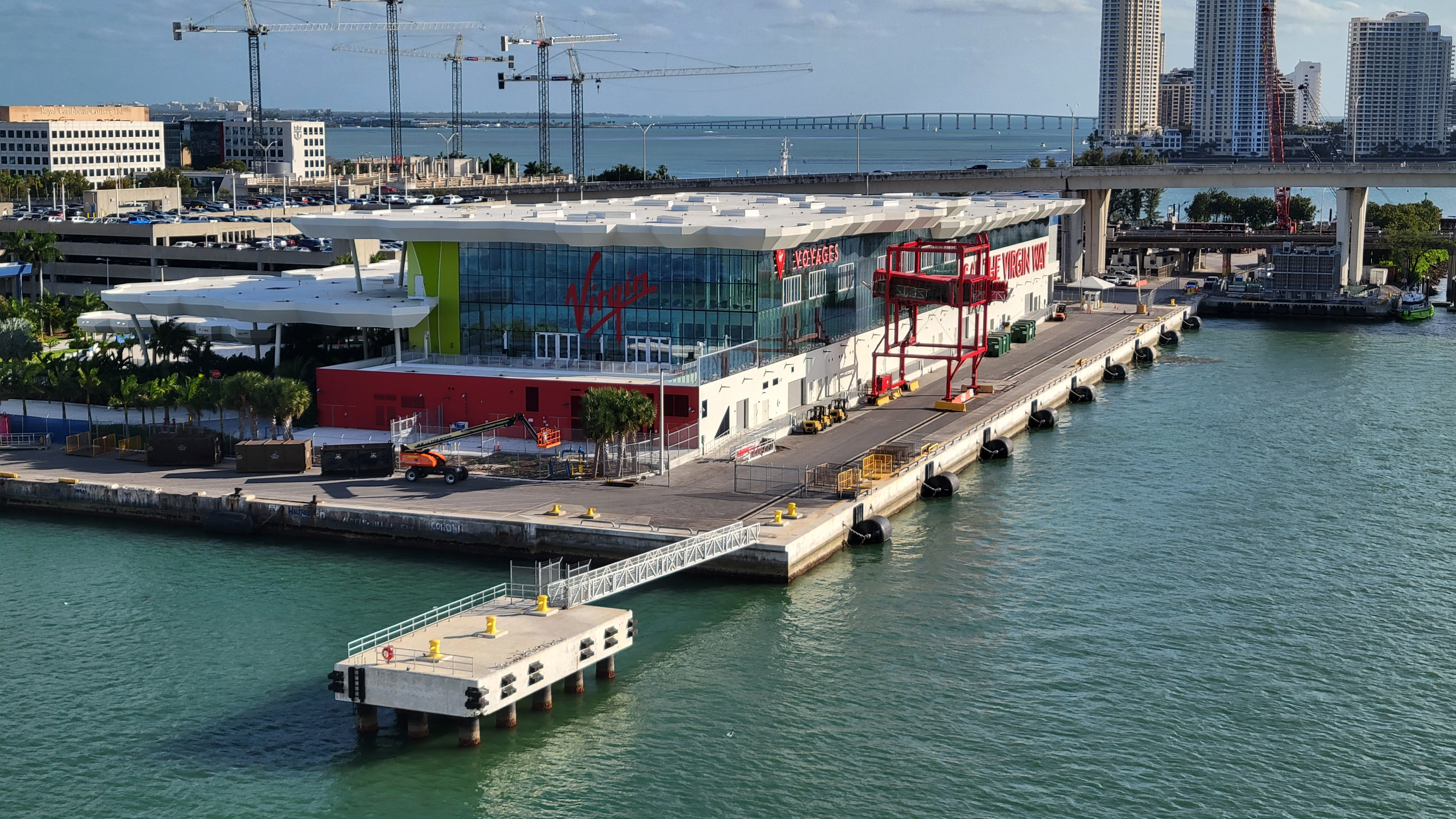
Virgin Voyages Terminal V at PortMiami (March 2024).

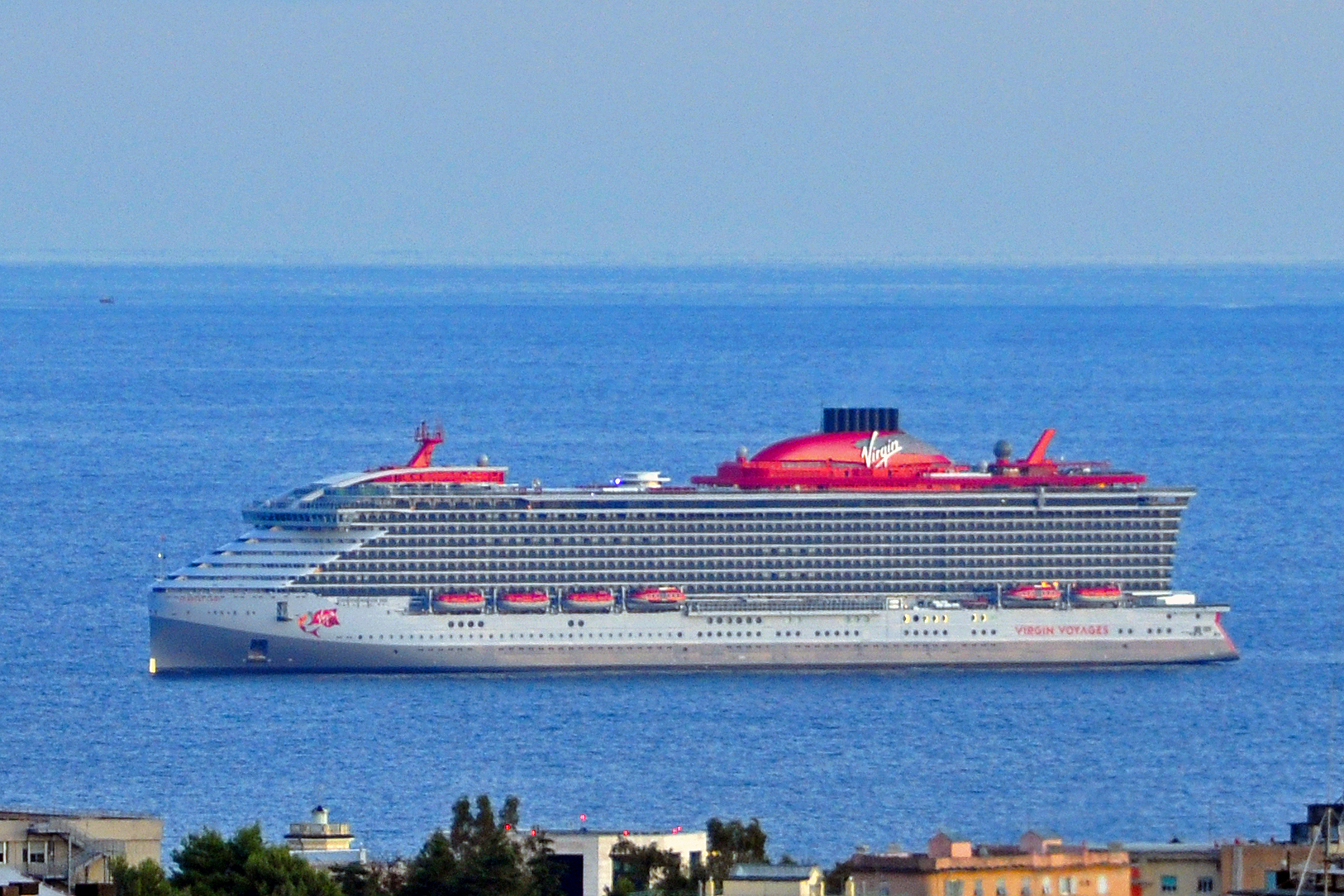
Scarlet Lady sailing from the Port of Genoa, 2020

In 2011, Nirmal Saverimuttu, a Virgin Group executive, and Tom McAlpin, then-CEO of The World, conceptualized the idea for a cruise line inspired by the Virgin brand housed under the Virgin Group umbrella. Saverimuttu later collaborated with Bain Capital to begin market research and found that there was potential in the cruise industry for a new line to emerge and also identified a large, young demographic yet to experience cruising that could become the brand's target market. Over the next three years, Saverimuttu and McAlpin raised US$700 million from Bain Capital, which had become lead investor, and other institutional and private investors, and also borrowed an additional US$1–1.5 billion. After the financial backing, on December 4, 2014, Virgin Group announced the establishment of Virgin Cruises. The cruise line would be led by Tom McAlpin, who was named president and CEO.

At time of establishment, Virgin announced the new cruise line's fleet would consist of two ships and its headquarters would be based in the Miami/Fort Lauderdale area. In July 2015, the Miami-Dade County Commission granted Virgin Voyages approval to berth at PortMiami, and the company's first contract for three cruise ships was finalized on October 18, 2016, the same day that Virgin Cruises rebranded as Virgin Voyages, in an effort to strengthen its marketing aimed at the younger demographic and new cruisers.

In February 2018, Virgin Voyages debuted its headquarters in Plantation, Florida. In November 2018, Virgin Voyages expanded its commitment to Miami by announcing it would build Terminal V, a new 100,000 square-foot terminal at PortMiami estimated at US$150 million, with a scheduled completion in November 2021, and also sail the cruise line's first two vessels from Miami through 2022. In February 2019, Virgin Voyages announced it would design a new private destination called The Beach Club, located on the Bahamian island of Bimini. The resort would be developed in partnership with Genting Group's Resorts World Bimini and would feature a variety of local cuisine offerings and scheduled activities for guests. In September 2019, Virgin Voyages was granted a 30-year berthing rights agreement at PortMiami.

Virgin Voyages' official debut had originally been scheduled for April 1, 2020, with the maiden voyage of Scarlet Lady, but the COVID-19 pandemic delayed the cruise line's launch, having had to initially postpone the voyage until August 7, 2020, and ultimately, October 16, 2020. The first sailing with paying guests commenced on August 6, 2021, from Portsmouth.

In December 2023 Virgin Voyages launched services in Australia with Resilient Lady arriving in Sydney. Richard Branson was in attendance at the launch. Despite the media interest, Virgin Voyages cancelled the ship's 2024/25 Summer Season because of the Red Sea crisis.

In September 2025, Brilliant Lady entered the fleet as the 4th ship. Identical to her sister ships in most ways, Brilliant's lifeboats are set further in, making her the only ship in the Virgin fleet capable of transversing the Panama Canal. She sailed her maiden voyage in September 2025 from New York City round trip to Bermuda.

In August 2026, Valiant Lady became Virgin Voyages’ first ship to use European shore power meaning she could switch off her engines while in port and instead, the ship drew electricity directly from the local grid (All four Ships are equipped with shore power technology)

== Fleet ==
On June 23, 2015, Virgin announced that it had signed a binding letter of intent with Italian shipbuilder Fincantieri for the construction of three cruise ships to be delivered in 2020, 2021 and 2022—mid-sized vessels of 110,000 GT each with 1,150 crew, and 1,430 guest cabins capable of hosting a total of more than 2,800 passengers. The final contract for the construction of the ships was signed in October 2016, with the total cost expected to be under US$2 billion. McAlpin explained the ships would be designed differently from existing ships in the market, targeting the "young at heart." The fleet uses a stern design which maximizes “billboard value” visibility of the red Virgin logo, visible up to two nautical miles away. A fourth ship was ordered in October 2018 for delivery in 2023.

In November 2016, Virgin Voyages announced it had partnered with Climeon for its clean energy system to be deployed on its ships to generate energy from the engines' cooling water to reduce carbon dioxide emissions. In February 2019, Virgin Voyages also revealed it would ban all single-use plastics from its fleet.

In February 2024, satellite operator, SES announced that Virgin Voyages will be the first cruise line to deploy its SES Cruise mPOWERED + Starlink PRO satellite internet service that for the first time uses satellites in both Low Earth Orbit and Medium Earth Orbit to provide passengers with internet, social media and video calls at up to 1.5 Gbit/s per ship anywhere in the World.

Brilliant Lady is the first and only ship in the Virgin Voyages fleet capable of traversing the Panama Canal, enabling access to the west coast of the US and notably Alaska.

=== Current fleet ===
Name	Flag	Entered service	Gross tonnage	Guest capacity	Shipyard	Notes	Image
Scarlet Lady	Bahamas	2020	108,192 GT	2,700	Fincantieri (Sestri Ponente)	Debut delayed due to COVID-19 pandemic	
Valiant Lady	Bahamas	2021	108,192 GT	2,700	Fincantieri (Sestri Ponente)	Steel cut on 20 July 2018; Keel laid on 8 February 2019; Floated out on 20 May 2020Can use Shore power	
Resilient Lady	Bahamas	May 2023	108,232 GT	2,700	Fincantieri (Sestri Ponente)	delayed until Q2 2023	
Brilliant Lady	Bahamas	September 5, 2025	108,232 GT	2,700	Fincantieri (Sestri Ponente)	Debut delayed 2025	Virgin Voyages Brilliant Lady at Civitavecchia, Italy
