= International LGBTQ+ Travel Association =

Tourism organization with LGBTQ+ focus

- Abbreviation: IGLTA
- Formation: 1983
- Type: Business association
- Purpose: To provide free travel resources and information while continuously working to promote equality and safety within LGBTQ tourism worldwide
- Website: www.iglta.org

The International LGBTQ+ Travel Association (abbreviated IGLTA, and formerly named the International Gay and Lesbian Travel Association) is an association of tourism businesses that welcome the LGBTQ+ community. As of 2016, the association had member businesses in about 80 countries.

== History ==
IGLTA is a network of tourism businesses in about 80 countries that welcome the LGBTQ+ community, and includes accommodations, transport, destinations, service providers, travel agents, tour operators, events, and travel media. The organization also provides travel resources and information to travel consumers and promotes equality and safety within the LGBTQ+ tourism industry.

Founded in 1983 by a group of 25 travel agents and hotel owners, IGLTA has since grown significantly.

The association has historically had several names:

- From 1983 to 1997, the organization was known as IGTA (International Gay Travel Association).
- From 1997 to 2019, the organization was known as the International Gay and Lesbian Travel Association.
- In March 2019, the name was changed to the International LGBTQ+ Travel Association.

IGLTA was "the first gay organization to receive Affiliate Member status in the World Tourism Organization (UNWTO) in November 2010".

In November 2015 the IGLTA became an orgizational partner with the Pacific Asia Travel Association (PATA)

In 2016 the IGLTA was awarded the Winq Magazine Travel Award in London.

== Governance ==
The IGLTA has two boards: the IGLTA Association board of directors, which is the governing body for the association and oversees the organization's strategy and direction; and the IGLTA Foundation board of directors, which manages the foundation's finances and establishes official policies that govern the foundation.

The current IGLTA Association board of directors to September 2021 consists of an executive board: Jon Muñoz, chair; Don Skeoch, vice chair; Felipe Cardenas, treasurer; Shiho Ikeuchi, secretary; Juan P. Julia Blanch, immediate past chair. Board members include: Albert Herrera; Uwern Jong; Richard Kreiger; Steven Larkin; Sandi Robinson; Apoorva Gandhi; Oriol Pamies and Maria Tuttocuore. John Tanzella, IGLTA's CEO acts as ex officio board member.

LGBT activist Juan P. Julia Blanch was the outgoing chairman for the board of directors at IGLTA.

== International Symposium and World Convention ==
The International Gay and Lesbian Travel Association (IGLTA) holds an annual world convention and four symposia in different tourism destinations around the world. The international symposium attracts more than 500 attendees, including destination CVB officials, travel agents, airline employees, hotel employees and tourism professionals. The foundation of IGLTA also sponsors scholarships for students to attend the international symposiums each year. Previous scholarships have been awarded to students from Brazil, Colombia, China, Curaçao, Jamaica, Japan, Liberia, Norway, Peru, South Africa, Suriname, Spain and the United States.

The 36th annual world convention was held in New York City in late April 2019, one month prior to the WorldPride festival being held in the city throughout June to commemorate the 50th anniversary of the Stonewall riots. The 37th annual world convention will be held in Milan in May 2020.

== IGLTA Foundation ==
The mission statement of the IGLTA Foundation (2019): The IGLTA Foundation supports the mission of IGLTA and its members through education, research and leadership development that benefits the global LGBTQ+ tourism industry.

Founded in 2012 with the support of the IGLTA Foundation founding partner Delta Air Lines, the IGLTA Foundation is the 501(c)(3) organization and public charity subsidiary of the International LGBTQ+ Travel Association. The IGLTA Foundation supports initiatives for industry organizations, leaders and communities to advance LGBTQ+ travel around the world. A board of directors governs the IGLTA Foundation, overseeing the organization's strategy and direction. The IGLTA Foundation Board of Directors operates by a standard of bylaws.

Areas of activity for the IGLTA Foundation focus on "leadership", research, and education.

The IGLTA Foundation encourages governments and tourism industry leaders to make LGBTQ+ travelers feel safe and welcome. The IGLTA Foundation provides resources for IGLTA to engage with other non-governmental organizations as well as governments and tourism boards to speak on the positive economic and cultural impact of LGBTQ+ tourism. The IGLTA Foundation is also an official partner of ECPAT International (formerly End Child Prostitution And Trafficking).

The IGLTA Foundation funds research to promote understanding of LGBTQ+ travel within the global tourism industry. The IGLTA Foundation funds IGLTA to collect and disseminate industry research. This research provides demographic information about LGBTQ+ travelers and economic data about the LGBTQ+ tourism market. The IGLTA Foundation also funds original research on issues affecting the LGBTQ+ travel industry.

IGLTAF also funds IGLTA memberships for LGBTQ+ small tourism business owners in emerging destinations that lack governmental or industry support. Since 2012, Association memberships have been funded for small businesses in Cambodia, China, Colombia, Ecuador, Indonesia, Jamaica, Montenegro, Peru, Romania, Serbia, Singapore, Sri Lanka, Trinidad and Vietnam.

The IGLTA Foundation also supports scholarships for students and small business owners to attend the annual IGLTA Global Convention.

== Trump controversy ==
On July 5, 2015, the IGLTA sent an email to its members announcing the addition of its newest member businesses. The email included three Trump-branded properties: Trump SoHo New York, Trump International Hotel & Tower Chicago, and Trump International Hotel & Tower New York. This was not the first time the IGLTA had included Trump-branded properties. A Change.org petition dating to 2011 encouraged the organization to "Dump Trump Properties".

On July 7, 2017, the IGLTA gave an official statement to the Windy City Times, IGLTA President/CEO John Tanzella said, "IGLTA is a member-based travel association promoting LGBTQ friendly travel options. IGLTA also aims to support and educate businesses that want to better respond to the needs of LGBTQ clients. "The Trump branded properties which are current members of IGLTA (2017) are independently owned hotels and not owned by Mr. Trump."

Donald Trump has spoken out against LGBT rights and same-sex marriage. As President of the United States, he was the first president since George W. Bush to not acknowledge June as Pride Month.

Few people have expressed concern surrounding the topic, despite the differences between the President of the United States and non-affiliated, privately owned, LGBTQ-friendly travel accommodations. On June 20, Trump's Chicago hotel was briefly illuminated in rainbow colors, presumably in recognition of Pride celebrations the following weekend. NBC 5 tweeted a photo of the display.

== See also ==
- LGBT tourism
