= LGBTQ tourism =

Tourism marketed to LGBTQ people

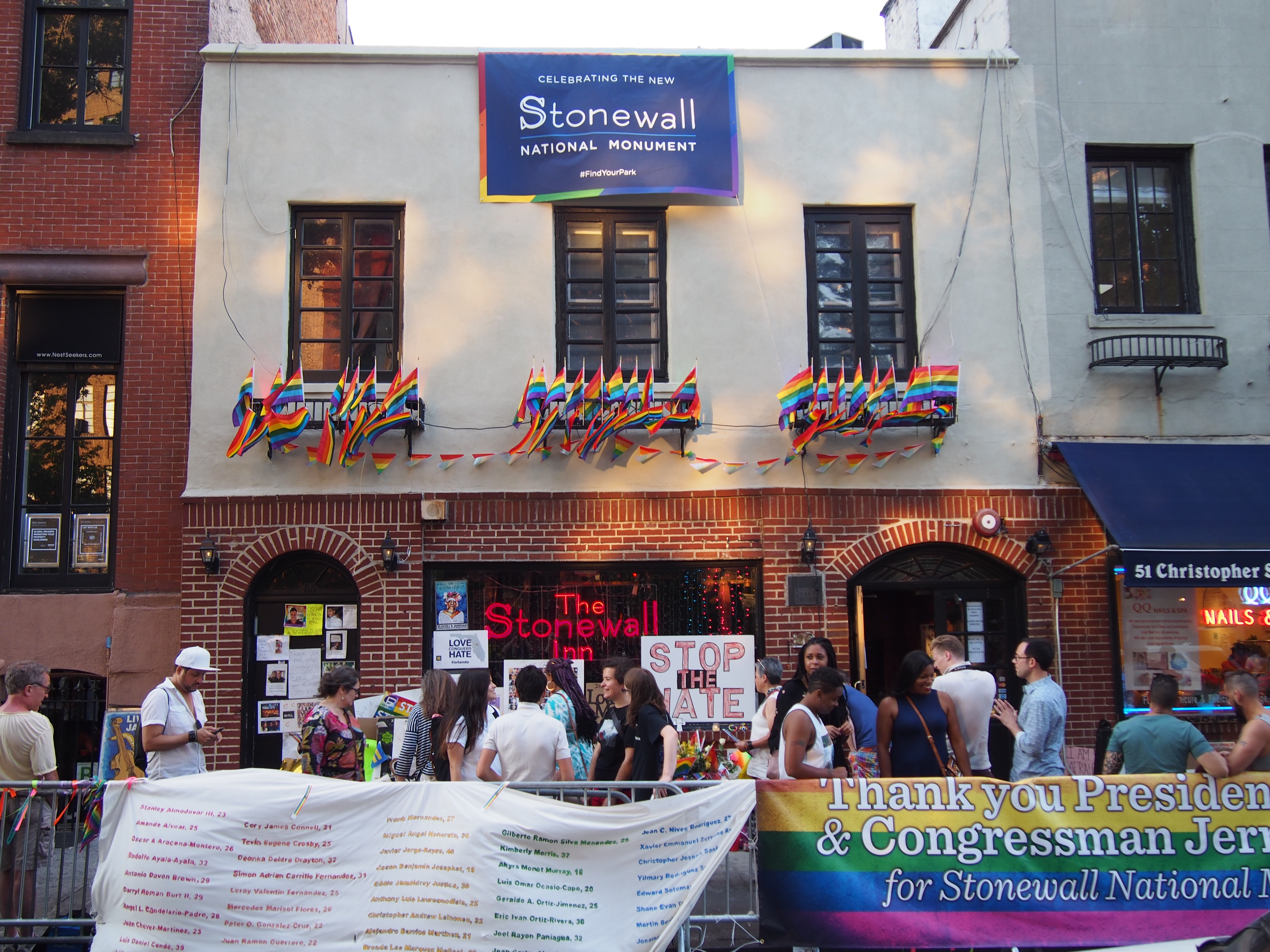
The Stonewall Inn, in the gay village of Greenwich, Manhattan, NY (site of the June 1969 Stonewall riots) is a popular LGBTQ pilgrimage destination.

LGBTQ tourism (or gay tourism) is a form of tourism marketed to gay, lesbian, bisexual, transgender, and queer (LGBTQ) people. It may also include a focus on other members of the (broader) community.

The tourism, and its related establishments, may have the goal of celebrating the community, commemorating the LGBT+ rights movement, educating members outside of the community, or a combination of these elements.

The main components of LGBTQ tourism include: destinations, accommodations, and travel services wishing to attract LGBTQ tourists; people looking to travel to LGBTQ-friendly destinations; people wanting to travel with other LGBTQ people when traveling regardless of the destination; and LGBTQ travelers who are mainly concerned with cultural and safety issues.

The slang term gaycation has come to imply a version of a vacation that includes a pronounced aspect of LGBTQ culture, either in the journey or destination.

The LGBTQ tourism industry includes destinations (tourism offices and CVBs), travel agents, accommodations and hotel groups, tour companies, cruise lines, and travel advertising and promotions companies who market these destinations to the gay community.

Coinciding with the increased visibility of LGBTQ people raising children in the 1990s, an increase in family-friendly LGBTQ tourism has emerged in the 2000s, for instance R Family Vacations which includes activities and entertainment geared towards couples including same-sex weddings.

R Family's first cruise was held aboard Norwegian Cruise Lines's Norwegian Dawn with 1600 passengers including 600 children.

Major companies in the travel industry have become aware of the substantial money (also known as the "pink money") generated by this marketing niche and have made it a point to align themselves with the gay community and gay tourism campaigns.

According to a 2000 Travel University report, 10% of international tourists were gays and lesbians, accounting for more than 70 million arrivals worldwide. This market segment is expected to continue to grow as a result of ongoing acceptance of LGBTQ people and changing attitudes towards sexual and gender minorities.

Outside larger companies, LGBTQ tourists are offered other traditional tourism tools, such as networks of LGBTQ individuals who offer each other hospitality during their travels and even home swaps where people live in each other's homes. Also, available worldwide are social groups for resident and visiting gay, lesbian, bisexual, and transgender expatriates and friends.

== LGBTQ travel destinations ==
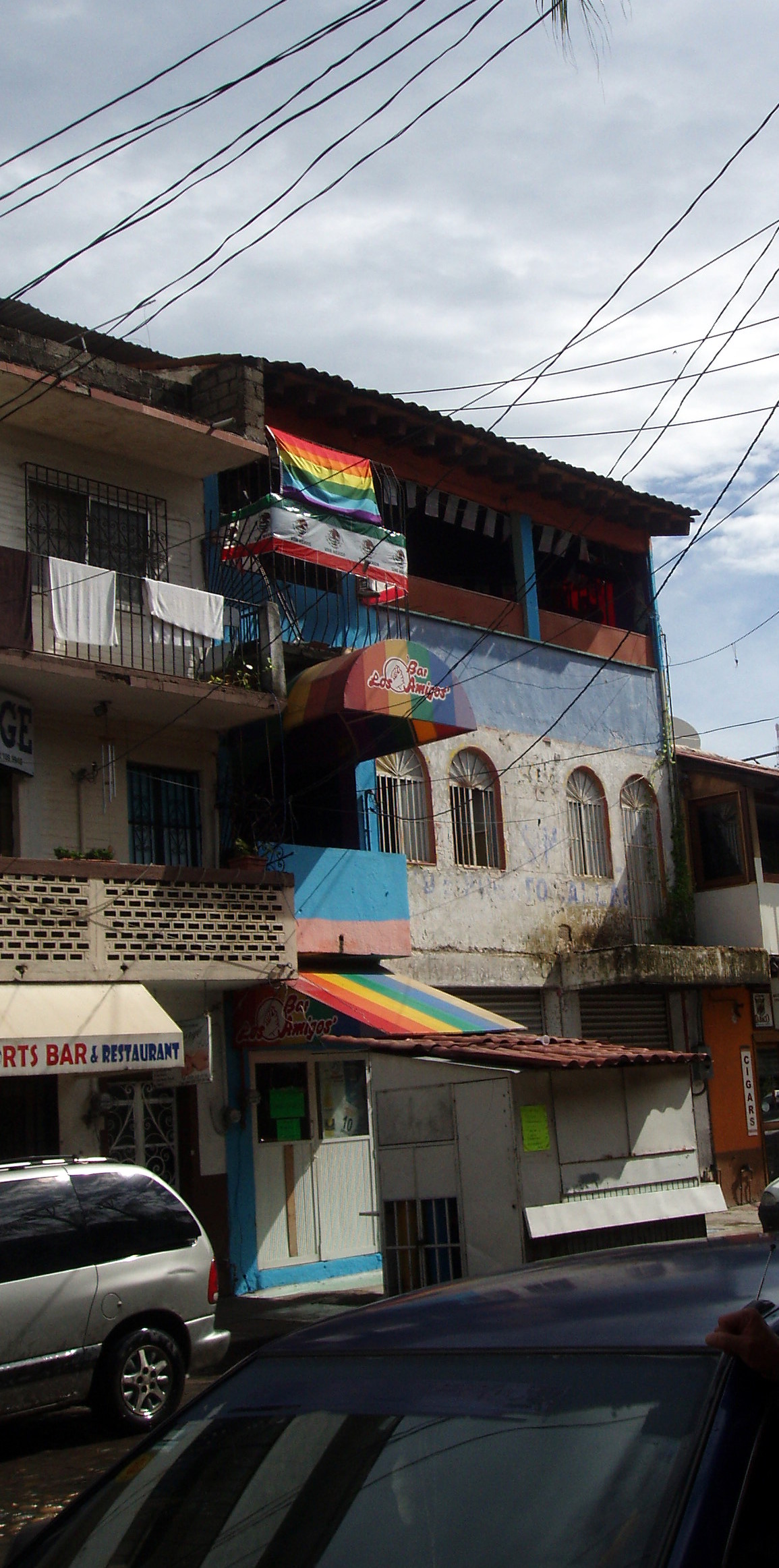
Local gay bar in LGBTQ-friendly Puerto Vallarta, Mexico.

LGBT-friendly travel destinations are popularly known because they usually maintain welcoming attitudes, with local leaders and business owners instilling a consciousness and positive awareness of LGBTQ travelers to their fellow inhabitants and employees.

These locales also feature infrastructure, businesses and services whose representatives are sensitive to and friendly with LGBT travelers; this includes everything from bars, travel agencies/guides, restaurants, hotels, resorts, nightlife, entertainment, media, political/legal aid and, more than anything, the opportunity to meet others and socialize.

Gay travel destinations are often medium to large cities, and can coincide with the existence of gay neighborhoods. These neighborhoods often work actively to develop their reputations as safe and fun, specifically for LGBTQ people, to travel to.

LGBTQ travel guide Queer in the World states, "The fabulosity of Gay New York is unrivaled on Earth, and queer culture seeps into every corner of its five boroughs".

The LGBTQ tourism industry is highly profitable; an average of US$65 billion is spent on gay travel in the US alone, annually. According to In Europe, the gay tourism market has been estimated at €50 billion per year by the Gay European Tourism Association.

The adult LGBTQ community in the US had a total economic spending power of more than $600 billion annually, as of 2007 (according to Witeck-Combs), and by 2016 this had risen to $917 billion. Some governments tend to highlight this for foreign visitors, like the official US website that promotes historic New York places in Greenwich Village, such as the Stonewall Inn or Eve's Hangout, that are well-known sites to visit for Europeans.

Philadelphia was the first destination in the world to create and air a television commercial specifically marketed towards gay tourists. Philadelphia was also the first destination to commission a research study, aimed at a specific destination, to learn about gay travel to a specific city.

Cape Town, South Africa serves as a popular LGBTQ+ tourism destination, hosting a number of same-sex weddings and honeymoons. South Africa's constitution prohibits discrimination on the basis of sexual orientation, and was the 5th country worldwide to legalize same sex marriage in 2006.

De Waterkant is a well-known gay village in Cape Town. Known as the city's gayborhood, De Waterkant is home to a permanent rainbow crosswalk, and numerous LGBTQ+-related establishments. Since 2022, the area has also been home to the Pink Lane, a pink, painted line along certain sidewalks, that takes visitors on a tour of LGBTQ+-related establishments around the area, with the goal of celebrating the community, and its inclusivity.

== Tourism planners ==
The International Gay and Lesbian Travel Association (IGLTA) holds an annual world convention and four symposia in different tourism destinations around the world. Each symposium attracts over 500 representatives of convention & visitor bureaus, tour agencies and travel publications that specialize in the gay and lesbian market.

The Association was founded in 1983, and it currently represents over 2000 members. Its headquarters are in Fort Lauderdale, Florida. The "17th International Conference on Gay & Lesbian Tourism" was held in Las Vegas, Nevada, United States, on 11–13 December 2016.

With nine issues a year, Passport Magazine is currently the only gay and lesbian travel magazine still in publication in the United States. It is available internationally. Spartacus International and FunMaps of Maplewood, New Jersey, have promoted gay- and lesbian-friendly businesses since 1982. One of Europe's gay and lesbian travel marketing specialists is Out Now Consulting.

The Gay European Tourism Association (GETA) works to promote and enhance LGBT tourism in Europe.

In 2003, LGBT activist Juan P. Julia Blanch opened the first gay-friendly hotel chain Axel Hotels in several cities and countries around the world.

== LGBT events ==
There are a large number of LGBT events, such as:

- Gay Days at Walt Disney World in Orlando, Florida. This is held the first weekend in June and is one of the biggest unofficial gay pride events in the world. Since Gay Days started, about 150,000 people attend this six-day event that includes "17 pool parties, a business expo, a comic-book convention, a film festival, an after-hours trip to a Disney water park (think dance music and guys in very small swimsuits), bobble-head painting, and tie-dyeing for the kids, rivers of alcohol for the adults, and on June 5th the great culmination: 20,000 to 30,000 lesbians, gays, and their families and friends descending on Disney World, everyone clad in red shirts to signify their presence. (Cloud)"
- Seattle Pride in Seattle, Washington. It's held the last weekend of June, and it is the largest free pride festival in the country. It includes the Capitol Hill Pride Festival that has outdoor stages, a Kids Zone that has family entertainment until 6 pm; events after 6 pm are 21 and over. Then on Sunday is the Gay Pride Parade that goes through downtown Seattle and ends at a larger festival at the Seattle Center. It includes "4 stages, world-class entertainment, action and advocacy for the LGBT community, and thousands of vendors."
- East-Central Minnesota Pride in Pine City, Minnesota. It's held the first weekend in June and, in 2005, it was the first rural gay pride in the United States. It has endured despite protests from conservative Christians, and it bills itself as "The First Rural Pride", pulling people in from across Minnesota and western Wisconsin.
- Cape Town Pride in Cape Town, South Africa. Held each year in late February or early March, the city celebrates the community and hosts numerous events, which are organized by Cape Town Pride and OUTReach Africa. Cape Town Pride has run since 1993. The related events include a Roller Derby, Breakfast, Mardi Gras, Queer Surfing, and a Pride Parade. The march begins in the city's gay village, De Waterkant, at its rainbow crosswalk, and features drag, floats, and members from across the community coming together to celebrate its history and diversity.

== LGBT travel resources ==
Many OTA travel websites now feature LGBT travel search options. The most popular travel resources are still ones from local LGBT media organizations and online LGBT news and lifestyle websites. Additional destination-specific LGBT travel information is commonly found on niche gay travel blogs.

The US Department of State Bureau of Consular Affairs now offers information about LGBT travel and provides tips about what one can do before traveling. It also provides information about different issues one should take care of before traveling.

In 69 UN member states, there are laws that criminalize consensual same-sex relationships, making it important to check the laws of the country before travelling to avoid issues and persecution.

== See also ==
- Meeting of the Friends of Dorothy
- Gay naturism
- Gay village
- Gay-friendly
- Gaylocator
- LGBTQ cruises
- LGBTQ marketing
- LGBT tourism in South Africa
- Sydney Gay and Lesbian Mardi Gras

== Sources ==
Cloud, J. (2010). "Gay Days in the Magic Kingdom". Time, 175(24), 69–70.

Link, M. (2007). "Fantastic family fun". Advocate, (983), 52–53.

Scott Gatz. (2009). Advocate, (1027/1028), 87.
