= Finding Prince Charming =

2016 reality television series

- Genre: Reality television
- Presented by: Lance Bass
- Country of origin: United States
- Original language: English
- No. of seasons: 1
- No. of episodes: 9

Production
- Executive producers: Brian Graden; Dave Mace; Fred Birckhead; Nick Murray; Chris McCarthy; Pamela Post; Stevenson Greene
- Production locations: Los Angeles, California
- Running time: 43 minutes
- Production company: Brian Graden Media

Original release
- Network: Logo
- Release: September 8 – November 10, 2016

Finding Prince Charming is an American reality dating show that premiered on the cable network Logo on September 8, 2016. It is hosted by actor and pop singer Lance Bass. Robert Sepúlveda Jr., an interior designer based in Atlanta, was cast as a suitor for the first season.

The concept of the show was modeled after The Bachelor, but instead of having a rose ceremony, it features a black tie ceremony.

== Format ==
A cast of thirteen gay suitors will live together in one house with a Prince Charming in the search for love. Each week the Prince Charming will go on group or solo dates with different men. At the end of the episode, Prince Charming will have to eliminate contestants in a "black tie" ceremony, where black ties will be given to the guys he wants to keep and get to know more, while the guys who do not get a black tie will be eliminated. At the end of the process, Prince Charming will choose one man to try a relationship with outside of the series.

== Production ==
The American cable network Logo ordered production of Finding Prince Charming on July 12, 2016, and announced that Lance Bass would host the series. Shortly after the announcement, reports of the alleged suitor began and filming began in July 2016. Brian Graden, Dave Mace, Fred Birckhead, Nick Murray, Chris McCarthy, Pamela Post and Stevenson Greene are recognized as the series' executive producers; it is produced and distributed by Brian Graden Media.

On October 13, 2016, the series was renewed for a second installment. Applications for season two became available on November 3, 2016, and closed on November 16, 2016. Five suitors would be submitted to public voting and the winning suitor would be featured on season two as a contestant. Voting was from November 18 to November 23, 2016. However, as of 2023, a second installment has yet to be aired.

== Contestants ==
The cast consists of 13 eligible men from the ages of 26–35.

Contestant	Age	Hometown	Occupation	Outcome	Ref.
Eric Leonardos	35	Los Angeles, CA	Hair Stylist	Winner	
Brandon Kneefel	29	Los Angeles, CA	Behavioral Healthcare Administrator	Runner-Up	
Dillon Powell	26	West Hollywood, CA	Fashion Publicist and Designer	Quit in week 8	
Justin Roisom	29	Seattle, WA	Model and Project Manager	Eliminated in week 7	
Chad Aaron Spodick	32	New York, NY	Real Estate Agent	Quit in week 6	
Robby LaRiviere	26	West Hollywood, CA	Beauty Expert	Eliminated in week 5	
Paul Hollowell	34	Dallas, TX	Tanning Company Founder	Eliminated in week 4	
Danique McMillan	30	Los Angeles, CA	Business Analyst	Eliminated in week 3	
Sam Provenzano	31	Chicago, IL	Director of Planned Giving	Quit in week 3	
Jasen Kaplan	33	New York, NY	Celebrity Makeup Artist	Eliminated in week 2	
Brodney McClinton	34	Atlanta, GA	Personal Trainer	Eliminated in week 1	
Nick Barbati	31	Hamilton, NJ	College Event Administrator	Eliminated in week 1	
Charlie Erikson	26	Hermosa Beach, CA	Manny	Eliminated in week 1	

Contestants' ages are at the time of filming.

== Contestant progress ==
Suitor	1	2	3	4	5	6	7	8
Eric	IN	IN	IN	IN	IN	IN	IN	WINNER
Brandon	IN	IN	IN	IN	IN	IN	IN	ELIM
Dillon	IN	IN	IN	IN	IN	IN	IN	QUIT
Justin	IN	IN	IN	IN	IN	IN	ELIM	
Chad	IN	IN	IN	IN	IN	QUIT		
Robby	IN	IN	IN	IN	ELIM			
Paul	IN	IN	IN	ELIM				
Danique	IN	IN	ELIM					
Sam	IN	IN	QUIT					
Jasen	IN	ELIM						
Brodney	ELIM							
Nick	ELIM							
Charlie	ELIM							

The contestant received the first black tie or was called first to keep his black tie.
The contestant received the last black tie or was the last one called to keep his black tie.
The contestant quit the competition.
The contestant was eliminated.
The contestant was the runner up.
The contestant won Finding Prince Charming.

== Controversy ==
A week before the premiere, an industry trade report revealed that series suitor Robert Sepulveda Jr. had previously engaged in prostitution and escort work. The following week he discussed he started turning to paid sexual encounters beginning in his 20s, and also spoke about a pornographic video released by what he characterized as a disgruntled ex-boyfriend. Logo said it was not aware of Sepulveda's history until after production had started. Contestant Chad Aaron Spodick claimed he had been fired from his job following the controversy. In December 2025, it was reported that Spodick had died, aged 42. The cause of death was later confirmed to be suicide.

== Episodes ==
No.	Title	Original release date	US viewers (millions)
1	"A Second First Impression"	September 8, 2016	0.158 (Logo); 0.184 (VH1)
Robert, an Atlanta-based interior designer, is introduced to his thirteen suitors.
2	"The Canary"	September 15, 2016	0.158
Robert and the suitors set out for a day at the beach; two of the men are chosen for solo dates; a suitor is accused of inappropriate behavior.
3	"Sensing a Connection"	September 22, 2016	0.196
Robert and several of the suitors go wine tasting for a group date.
4	"Appetite for Love"	September 29, 2016	0.123
Robert chooses three suitors for individual dates; jealousy arises among the suitors.
5	"Man Behind the Mask"	October 6, 2016	0.137
The suitors are required to construct a mask for Robert to wear at a masquerade ball.
6	"What About Robert"	October 13, 2016	0.160
The suitors participate in a trivia game about Robert.
7	"A Family Affair"	October 27, 2016	0.157
Robert introduces the remaining suitors to his family, and his family's reactions cause him to reconsider his relationship with one of the suitors.
8	"The Last Black Tie"	November 3, 2016	0.131
Robert and the three remaining suitors go on a trip together, in which Robert picks his final suitor.
9	"Reunion: All Tied Up"	November 10, 2016	0.124
Robert and the 13 suitors discuss their experiences on the series and answer further questions posed by Lance Bass.

== International versions ==
A current production
Status unknown
No longer airing

Country	Name	Network	Prince	Host	Date premiered
Denmark	Prince Charming	Discovery+	Season 1, 2021: Jonas Løvik	none	March 23, 2021
Germany	Prince Charming	TVNOW (stream); VOX (television)	Season 1, 2019: Nicolas Puschmann; Season 2, 2020: Alexander Schäfer; Season 3, 2021: Kim Tränka; Season 4, 2022: Fabian Fuchs	none	October 30, 2019 (TVNOW); April 20, 2020 (VOX)
Germany	Princess Charming	TVNOW (stream); VOX (television)	Season 1, 2021: Irina Schlauch; Season 2, 2022: Hanna Sökeland; Season 3, 2023: Madleen Matthias; Season 4, 2024: Lea Hoppenworth	none	May 25, 2021 (TVNOW); October 29, 2021 (VOX)
Netherlands	Prince Charming	Videoland	Season 1, 2020–2021: Marvin Wijnans; Season 2, 2021–2022: Chris Berendse; Season 3, 2022–2023: Diego González-Clark	none	December 16, 2020
Poland	Prince Charming	Player (stream)	Season 1, 2021: Jacek Jelonek	Agnieszka Lal	October 12, 2021
