= Princess Charming =

Princess Charming may refer to:

- Princess Charming (operetta), an operetta by Albert Szirmai
- Princess Charming (film), a 1934 British musical comedy film, based on the operetta
- Princess Charming (Philippine TV series), a 2007 Philippine television drama series
- Princess Charming (German TV series), a 2021 German reality dating show
- "Princess Charming", a song by Pussy Riot from Matriarchy Now

== See also ==
- Prince Charming (disambiguation)
