= Battle of St. Vith =

1944 battle in Belgium during World War II

- Part of the Battle of the Bulge during World War II
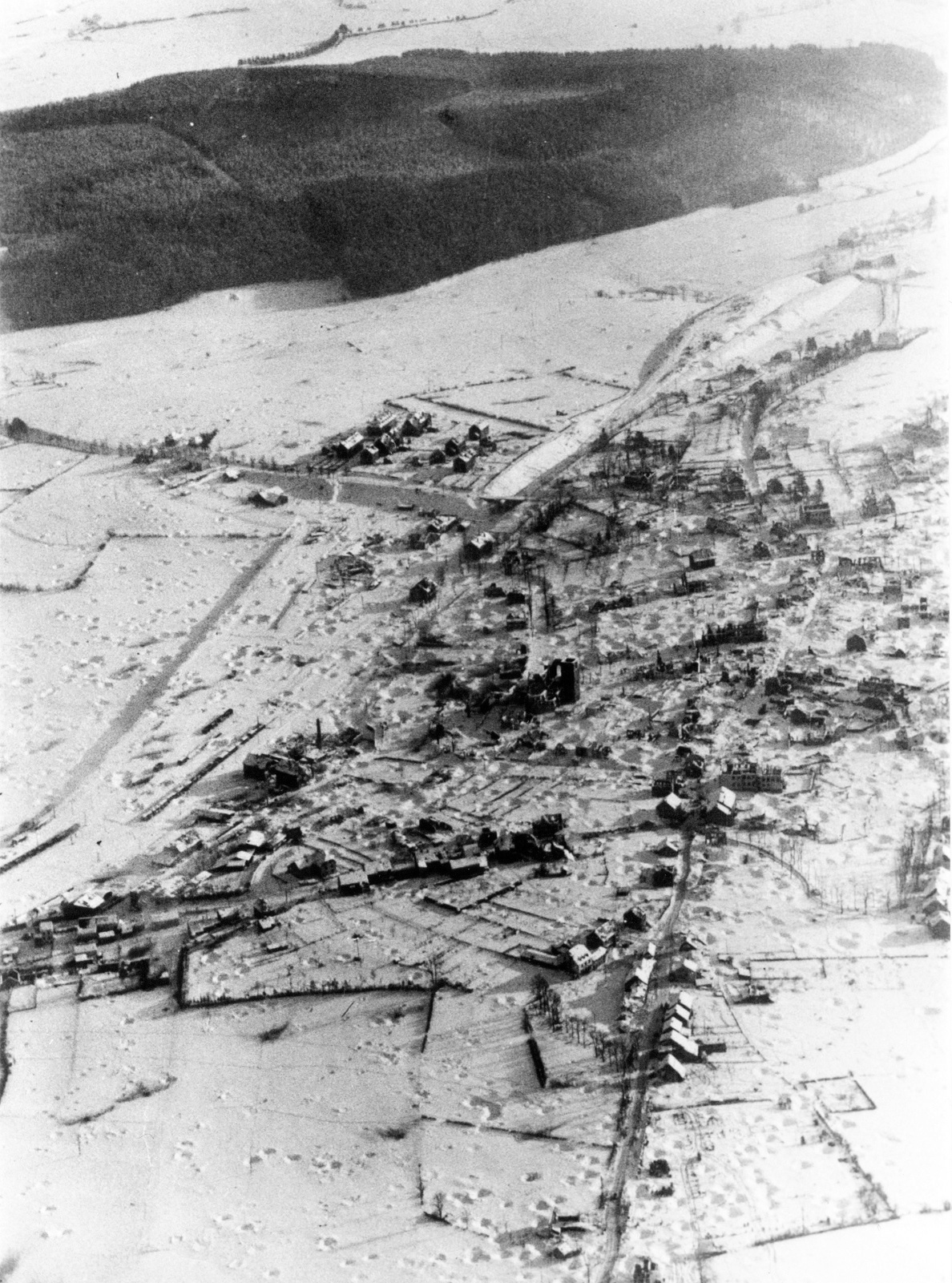
- St. Vith, Belgium
Date	16–21 December 1944
Location	St. Vith, Belgium 50°16′55″N 6°7′36″E
Result	German victory

Belligerents
United States	Germany

Commanders and leaders
(United Kingdom) Bernard Montgomery (United States) Bruce C. Clarke	(Germany) Walter Model (Germany) Hasso von Manteuffel (Germany) Sepp Dietrich

Units involved
U.S. VIII Corps: 7th Armored Division; 9th Armored Division; 28th Infantry Division; 106th Infantry Division	5th Panzer Army: 116th Panzer Division; Führer Begleit Brigade; 18th Volksgrenadier Division; 62nd Volksgrenadier Division; 6th Panzer Army: 1st SS Panzer Division Leibstandarte SS Adolf Hitler

Strength
22,000 men	100,000+ men 500 tanks

Casualties and losses
12,500 KIA, WIA, POW, or MIA; 88 tanks, 25 armored cars	Unknown

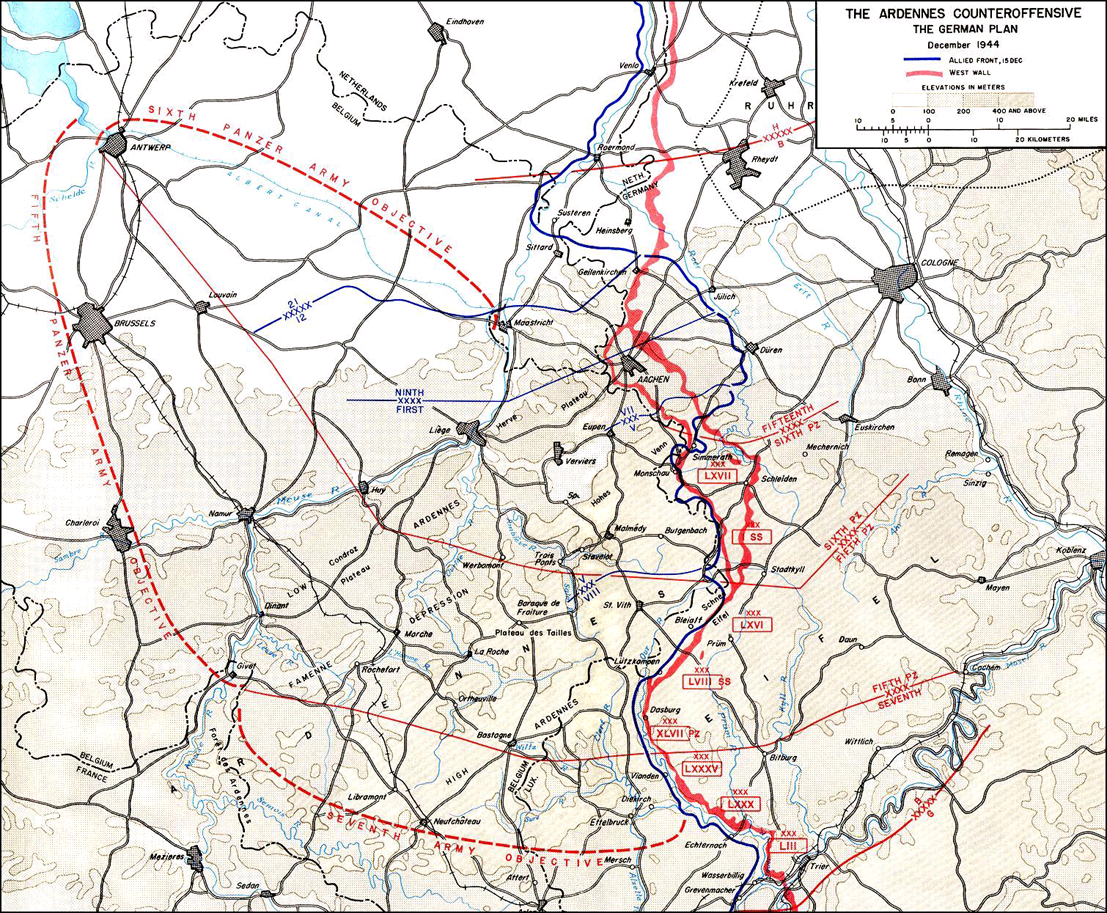
The German plan - LXVI Corps, 5th Panzer-Armee was assigned the capture of St. Vith.

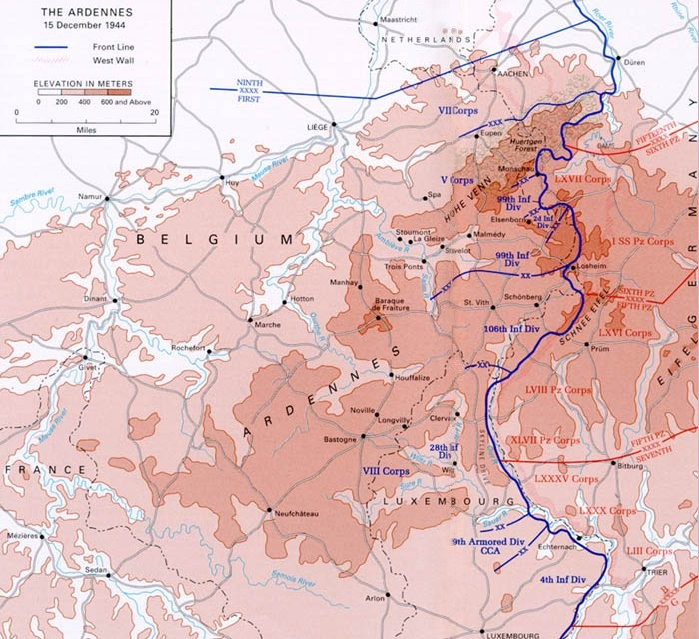
The Ardennes area of Belgium and Germany just before the German Ardennes counteroffensive, December 15, 1944.

The Battle of St. Vith was an engagement in Belgium fought during the Allied advance from Paris to the Rhine in World War II. It was one of several battles on December 16, 1944 constituting the opening of Germany's Ardennes counteroffensive (more commonly known as the "Battle of the Bulge").

The town of St. Vith, a vital road junction, was close to the boundary between the 5th Panzer Army and Sepp Dietrich’s 6th Panzer Army, the two strongest units of the attack. St. Vith was also close to the western end of the Losheim Gap, a critical valley through the densely forested ridges of the Ardennes Forest and the axis of the entire German counteroffensive. Opposing this drive were units of the U.S. VIII Corps. These defenders were led by the U.S. 7th Armored Division and included the 424th Infantry (the remaining regiment of the 106th U.S. Infantry Division), elements of the 9th Armored Division's Combat Command B and the 112th Infantry of the U.S. 28th Infantry Division. These units, which operated under the command of Generals Robert W. Hasbrouck (7th Armored) and Alan W. Jones (106th Infantry), successfully resisted the German attacks, thereby significantly slowing the German advance.

Under orders from Field Marshal Bernard Montgomery, Brigadier General Bruce Cooper Clarke, leader of Combat Command-B 7th Armored Division, gave up St. Vith on 21 December 1944; U.S. troops fell back to positions supported by the 82nd Airborne Division to the west, presenting an imposing obstacle to a successful German advance. By 23 December, as the Germans shattered their flanks, the defenders’ position became untenable and U.S. troops were ordered to retreat west of the Salm River. As the German plan called for the capture of St. Vith by 18:00 on 17 December, the prolonged action in and around it presented a major blow to their timetable.

== Background and movement to battle ==
=== German preparations: 15 September to 16 December 1944 ===
Adolf Hitler, dictator of the Third Reich, first outlined his plan for a decisive counteroffensive on the Western Front on 16 September 1944. This assault's goal was to pierce the thinly held lines of the U.S. First Army between Monschau and Wasserbillig with Army Group B commanded by Field Marshal (Generalfeldmarschall) Walter Model, cross the Meuse between Liege and Dinant, seize Antwerp and the western bank of the Scheldt Estuary. The main purpose of the counteroffensive was both political and diplomatic. Hitler contended that the alliance between the United Kingdom and the United States in Western Europe was unnatural and therefore fragile, and would shatter if subjected to a German drive that would place a wedge between the two nations. Germany could then make a separate peace with the Western Allies, and concentrate its armies for a successful drive against the Soviet Union.

In the months following the initial pronouncement, Hitler gathered reserves for his plan in great secrecy, realizing such a counterattack would have no success unless it was a complete surprise. His chosen commander for the Western Front and figurehead behind which new armies would rally was Gerd von Rundstedt, an aged field marshal of great reputation and respectability. Under his banner was recreated a rebuilt Army Group B consisting of three armies, 6th SS Panzer, 5th Panzer and 7th Army. These armies would drive west through the Ardennes in a repeat of the great western offensive of 1940, splitting the allied armies. The 6th SS Panzer Army would be the strong right arm of the offensive, on the northern flank and was tasked with driving through Elsenborn Ridge along the Albert Canal on the most direct route to Antwerp. The 5th Panzer Army would support the left flank of the 6th, and the less mobile 7th Army would block flanking attacks directed against the southern, or left flank, of the attacking armies.

The center army for the grand offensive was the 5th Panzer Army. It was neither as politically favored nor as well equipped as the 6th SS Panzer Army. However, the 5th Panzer Army did have an edge in leadership as it was under the command of General der Panzertruppen (General of Armored Forces) Hasso von Manteuffel, who was an expert in mechanized warfare from the Eastern Front. Manteuffel had a reputation for meticulous planning and daring execution, along with a flair for independent thinking that had led to trouble in the past with his superiors. As a technical expert, he still retained enough of a reputation to be trusted with a supporting role in the grand plan. Though second in power to 6th SS Panzer Army, the 5th Panzer Army still represented considerable mobile strength. Four Panzer Divisions and one Panzer Brigade were supported by five Volksgrenadier (People's Grenadier) divisions. Supporting these mobile fighting forces were numerous artillery, antiaircraft, and rocket bombardment units.

After being informed of the nature of the offensive in a meeting with Hitler, von Rundstedt and Model on 27 October 1944, Manteuffel proceeded to place his personal imprint on the grand plan. At first he supported Model's and Rundstedt's attempt to narrow the scope of the operation to the means that Army Group B could bring to bear. The offensive could not equal the strength of the 1940 invasion of the west. The number of vehicles and particularly the number of supporting aircraft would be lacking. Therefore, Manteuffel supported what came to be called the “small solution”, a limited envelopment that would destroy the American First and Ninth armies. Manteuffel referred to this plan as the “little slam”, a title from his love of contract bridge, as opposed to Hitler's “grand slam” plan for the occupation of Antwerp. However, Hitler would not hear of any abbreviation of his goals, so Antwerp remained the official objective, and Manteuffel had to content himself with minor tactical changes.

While detailing the deployment of his forces along the Westwall opposite the American lines, Manteuffel performed an extensive reconnaissance of the positions on the German 5th Panzer army front. Based on these observations, performed while disguised in an infantry colonel's uniform, Manteuffel suggested some changes to the attack plan. These changes involved limiting or eliminating the artillery bombardment in areas where American forces were in the habit of withdrawing for the night, or where they were so widely spaced as to allow German troops to advance around them during the night before the attack. He also suggested using searchlights reflecting light indirectly from the clouds to illuminate the advance in the winter darkness preceding the dawn. Hitler agreed to these changes.

In planning for the actual attack, Manteuffel had divided his 5th Panzer Army into three corps composed of infantry, tanks, and supporting artillery. The main effort, or schwerpunkt, would consist of XLVII Panzer Corps and LVIII Panzer Corps advancing west across the River Our at Ouren from the south or left flank of the German army front. They would then occupy the transportation center of Bastogne, before crossing the Meuse river at Namur. The third group, LXVI Corps, would advance west on either side of the Schnee Eifel. This northernmost, or right wing, element would flank and begin an envelopment of the American forces occupying fortifications on the Schnee Eifel and then converge on the town of Winterspelt. From there, LXVI Corps would cross the Our river and occupy St. Vith on the first day of the attack. LXVI Corps was the weakest of the three corps, with no attached tank division or motor transport, but did include an attached assault gun battalion. The Panzer Lehr Division (Armor Demonstration Division) and the Führer Begleit Brigade (Führer Escort Brigade) were to be held in reserve, with the Führer Begleit only usable with Model's express permission. Manteuffel's preference for the "little slam", or limited solution, was reflected in the absence of planning beyond reaching the Meuse River.

LXVI Corps comprised two Volksgrenadier divisions. Of the two, the 18th Volksgrenadier Division had been in the area the longest, since October, and was composed for the most part of a Luftwaffe (German Air Force) field division with additional troops from the Kriegsmarine (German Navy). This division was commanded by Colonel Hoffman-Schönborn and had been formed in Denmark in September. The 62nd Volksgrenadier Division, which was under the command of Colonel Friedrich Kittel, was formed from the remnants of the 62nd Infantry division, which had been destroyed on the Eastern Front, supplemented by Czech and Polish conscripts, most of whom could not speak German. General der Artillerie Walter Lucht, commander of LXVI Corps, regarded the 18th Volksgrenadier as the more reliable of the two, due to its familiarity with the local terrain, and its German composition. For this reason he trusted the 18th with the most complex components of the plan, and gave it more transport equipment.

The 18th Volksgrenadier Division would have the main role, the Schwerpunkt, in a series of envelopments that would cut off the units in the American line and lead to a final convergence of the 18th and 62nd Divisions on St. Vith. Manteuffel also made it clear that LXVI Corps's advance would depend on what the Germans called Stoßtrupptaktik (thrust troop tactics). This system of attack relied on special shock companies of 80 men that would utilize the rough terrain of the Ardennes to bypass strongpoints and seize key bridges, crossroads, and high ground. Manteuffel also set up a special mechanized combat engineer battalion using halftracks and self-propelled assault guns to clear road blocks and allow for fast flanking attacks.

=== American deployment and fortifications: 24 October to 15 December 1944 ===
While Manteuffel's LXVI Corps was gathering for the drive west, the U.S. 1st Army was preparing an attack of its own. In order to advance into Germany, the American high command realized it would have to control the dams that regulated water flow in the Roer River. The attack on the critical dams would be made by the 2nd Infantry Division. This veteran organization had fought its way across Europe from Normandy to the Schnee Eifel. In the process, it had occupied the German fortifications of the Westwall and set up fortifications to hold the ridgeline of the Eifel. In order to free-up the 2nd Division for the attack, its place in the defensive line was to be taken over by the newly arrived 106th Infantry Division.

The 106th Division began replacing the 2nd Infantry Division in the area of St. Vith and the Schnee Eifel on 10 December 1944. Despite the wishes of Major General Walter M. Robertson, commander of the 2nd Division, the 106th Division would also be deployed for an attack eastward, with most of its force isolated on the Schnee Eifel. In addition, in order not to alert the Germans of the change in divisions, the 106th could not bring any equipment forward and had to rely on equipment left behind by the 2nd Division. The 106th Division came out worse in this deal, for the 2nd had picked up extra communications gear, weapons, and vehicles in the course of its travels across Europe for which the 106th had no equivalent, so the 2nd took most of their equipment with them. The 106th had also suffered significant personnel changes, since sixty percent of its troop strength had been used to make up for higher than expected losses in units already in Europe. These losses had been made up from troops taken from disbanded small units, air cadets in training, and divisions not moving immediately to Europe. The effect of disruptions in organization, training, and equipment made the division relatively ineffective as a combat unit. The American high command believed that the static nature of the Ardennes area would allow time for the 106th to correct its deficiencies.

The 106th Division did have supporting units on its flanks and the area of the Losheim Gap to the north. After many requests from Robertson, the headquarters of the 14th Cavalry Group, commanded by Colonel Mark A. Devine, Jr., was moved into the area. Supporting the 14th were the 820th Tank Destroyer Battalion, with twelve 3” towed anti-tank guns, and the 275th Armored Field Artillery Battalion, with 18 M7 Priest Self-Propelled Howitzers. The headquarters group also brought with it a second cavalry squadron to screen the Losheim Gap, which was on the left flank of the 106th Division. While the two cavalry squadrons, the 14th and 18th, did not represent a lot of firepower, they did set up fortifications in small villages in the area. This transformed them into isolated strong points guarding road intersections. Most of the supporting firepower came from General Middleton, commander of the American VIII Corps, who arranged for eight of his thirteen reserve artillery battalions to support the area of the Schnee Eifel and the Losheim Gap, the central area of his front line. In late October, the 9th Armored Division had also been added to VIII Corps as a reserve, and part of the division had been moved up to support the 2nd Infantry Division's attack on the Roer River dams.

Sketch map of the first day of the attack of the German LXVI Corps. The furthest German advance has covered about five miles.

== The Battle of St. Vith, 16–21 December 1944 ==
=== The double envelopment of the Schnee Eifel ===
A little before 05:30 on Saturday, 16 December 1944, a selective artillery bombardment began falling on forward positions of the 106th Division on the Schnee Eifel, moving gradually back to the division headquarters in St. Vith. This attack did not do much damage to troops or fortifications, but did cut up most of the telephone wires the American army used for communications. The Germans also used radio jamming stations that made wireless communications difficult. This had the effect of breaking the defense into isolated positions, and denying corps and army commands information on events at the front line. The most significant aspect of the bombardment is where it did not fall. The villages on the left flank north of the Schnee Eifel were not hit at all. Here Manteuffel had found an undefended gap running between Weckerath to Kobscheid. Into the gaps between the villages marched the 18th Volksgrenadier Division, which bypassed the defended villages and headed for Auw before the general bombardment began. This movement would coincide with a southern advance of the 18th around the right flank of the Schnee Eifel through Bleialf to Schoenberg (Sankt Vith) to surround American positions on the Schnee Eifel ridge. This double envelopment came as a complete surprise to the American forces as a result of the intelligence failure at First Army level. The high command did not spot the buildup of the German forces for the offensive, and made no preparations to deal with it. This caused a paralyzing lack of situational awareness through the defending forces in front of St. Vith. The American commands in the rear found it difficult to abandon their own planned offensive in view of reacting to an unanticipated German attack. They were slow to react on the first day of LXVI Corps attack, giving the initiative to the attackers and multiplying the damage done.

After the initial artillery strike, searchlights behind the German line lit up, reflecting an eerie illumination from the clouds and lighting up the front lines. Moving forward with the glow, the 62nd Volksgrenadier Division advanced through Eigelscheid toward Winterspelt. This movement, combined with the advance of a southern column of the 18th Volksgrenadiers through Grosslangenfeld to meet the 62nd at Winterspelt' and combine for a capture of Steinebruck, with its bridge over the Our River. The capture of Schoenberg, (6 miles (9.7 km) east of St. Vith), also with a bridge over the Our and Steinebruck would set up LXVI Corps for an envelopment of St. Vith itself. The only significant check in the German advance was at Kobscheid, where the 18th Cavalry Reconnaissance Squadron had circled the village with barbed wire and dug in machine guns from their armored cars. Here, they held the village for the day; after dark, they destroyed their vehicles and abandoned their positions, withdrawing to St. Vith. In the other villages, the cavalry troops were forced to withdraw earlier in the day so as to avoid being surrounded and cut off. The Squadron was directed by Colonel Devine to take-up positions on a new defense line along the ridge running from Manderfeld to Andler, on the north side of the Our River.

By the end of the first day, the Volksgrenadiers of LXVI Corps had not made it to St. Vith, or even the critical bridges on the Our River at Schoenberg and Steinebruck. The American village strong points set up by the cavalry groups and sustained artillery fire from both VIII Corps reserve and the units supporting the 106th division had denied LXVI Corps the roads, but the Volksgrenadiers had not been depending on them anyway. Their main problems proved to be the same miserable weather and terrain conditions that prompted the Ardennes counteroffensive in the first place. Colonel Friedrich Kittel of the 62nd Division had set up a bicycle battalion to make a fast run on St. Vith from Eigelscheid, but the snow, ice, and mud had made it ineffective. Expert ski troops could have covered the 11–15 miles (18–24 km) of snow covered forested ravines from the Schnee Eifel to St. Vith in one day, but the Volksgrenadiers simply did not have that kind of training or equipment. They did not even have the training it took to take full advantage of the motorized assault guns they did have. This was not enough to pull off a carefully timed series of sequential envelopments and advances through rough terrain.

On the American side, the significant events were decisions from General Courtney Hodges, commander of First Army, and General Middleton of VIII Corps, committing combat commands of the 7th and 9th Armored Divisions to support the 106th Division defense. Middleton also threw in the 168th battalion of corps engineers from the Corps reserve. General Alan W. Jones, commander of the 106th had also sent reinforcements to Winterspelt and Schoenberg around noon. There was also a counterattack by Colonel Charles C. Cavender of the 423d Regiment, which retook the village of Bleialf. The more significant event was an interruption in communications that led Jones to believe Middleton did not wish a retreat from the Schnee Eifel. Middleton stated to others that Jones would move the 106th west of the Our River about the same time.

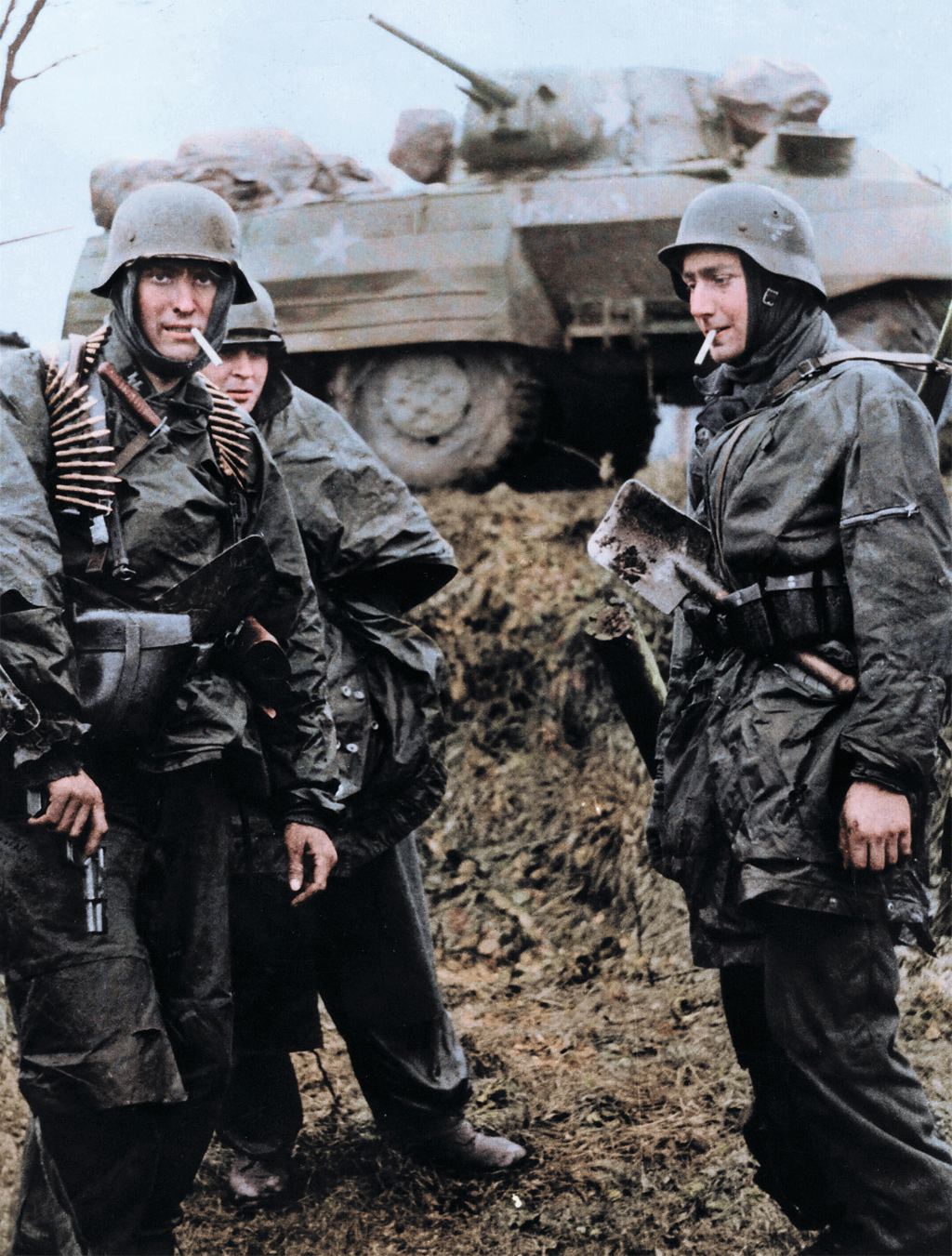
SS-Men from Kampfgruppe Hansen (LSSAH) after a successful ambush on a convoy of the 14th Cavalry Group on the road between Poteau and Recht in Belgium (December 18, 1944).

Before dawn on 17 December, the German LXVI Corps renewed its advance on the Our River. Winterspelt fell to the 62nd Volksgrenadiers early in the day. They then advanced to the critical bridge at Steinebruck and advanced past it, but were thrown back by a counterattack by the American 9th Armored Division's CCB. They were also considering retaking Winterspelt, but Middleton ordered a general withdrawal behind the Our River. As German troops were massing on the opposite bank, the 9th Armored would blow up the bridge on 18 December, and fall back to a defensive line with the 7th Armored Division on the left and the remaining 424th Regiment of the 106th Division on the right. The southern arm of the 18th Volksgrenadiers overran Bleialf at about the same time as the attack on Winterspelt. The northern arm of the 18th struck at Andler, receiving unexpected help from the 6th SS Panzer Army. The lavish supply of heavy armored fighting vehicles had proved an embarrassment of riches in the area north of 5th Panzer Army - the road net in the northern area of the attack was unable to support the volume of the attack, so the vehicles of the Schwere Panzerabteilung 506 wandered south into the 5th Army's area in search of a road west. The super heavy tanks of this unit, the Tiger II, were slow and of such weight as to endanger any bridge they crossed. However, in combat they were virtually unstoppable and they easily routed the light cavalry forces of the 32nd Squadron's Troop B, holding Andler. From there, the troops of the 18th Volksgrenadiers swept onward toward Schoenberg. The heavy tanks of the 506th did not join them, creating a traffic jam in the narrow streets of Andler. The jam was expanded by additional traffic from 6th Panzer Army, blocking the advance far more effectively than American forces could hope. This jam would be the first of many plaguing both sides in the paths of the German advance. Andler, Schoenberg and the road west of St. Vith, to the west of the town of Rodt would all be the scenes of traffic blockages that would attract the personal intervention of most of the field commanders in the area of St. Vith, all to no avail. General Lucht of LXVI Corps was the first commander to waste his efforts clearing the jam at Andler, but not the last.

The 18th Volksgrenadiers captured the bridge at Schoenberg by 08:45, cutting off American artillery units attempting to withdraw west of the Our River. The southern pincer of the 18th, advancing from Bleialf against scattered American resistance, was slower than the northern group. As a result, Manteuffel's trap on the Schnee Eifel did not close until nightfall on 17 December. Jones had given the troops east of the Our River permission to withdraw at 09:45, but it was too late to organize an orderly withdrawal by that time. This order, and the slow German southern arm, gave more Americans a chance to escape, but since they had newly arrived in the area, and had few compasses or maps, most were unable to take advantage of the opportunity. The American positions east of the Our had become the Schnee Eifel Pocket.

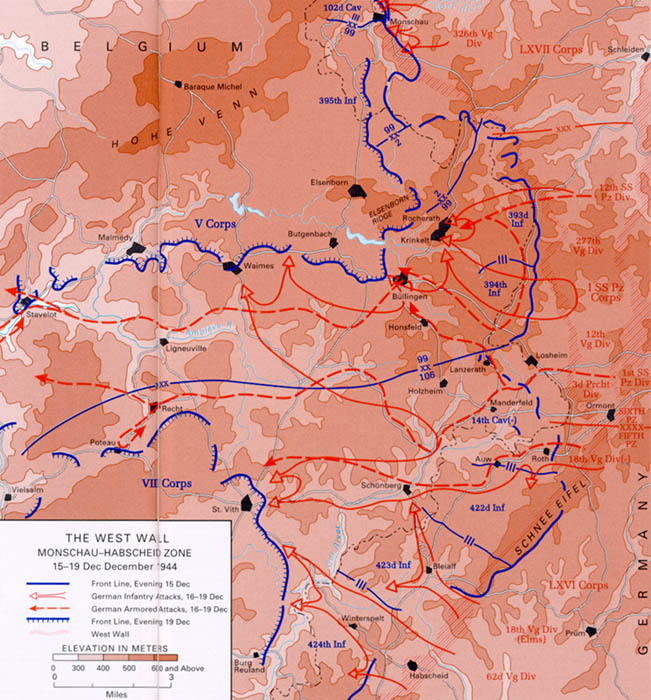
St. Vith area and surroundings, December 15-19th, 1944. (U.S. Army CMH)

=== The surrender of the Schnee Eifel pocket, 19–21 December 1944 ===
Following the German attacks sweeping around their position, the two regiments of the 106th Division, the 422nd and 423rd had remained in place, since they had heard that the Germans would launch artillery and patrols against them as they would any new division taking a place on the line. The German activity during the counter offensive seemed to follow this pattern, and since communication with the division headquarters in St. Vith was unreliable and intermittent, the Americans had remained for the most part inert. The few messages received indicated they could withdraw, but that counterattacks from the 7th and 9th Armored divisions would probably clear the Germans out of the area anyway. It was only at 02:15 on 18 December that they received an order from Jones to break out to the west along the Bleialf - Schoenberg – St. Vith road, clearing the area of Germans in the process. At 10:00 that morning, the breakout began with Cavender leading the attack with the 423d Infantry. By nightfall both regiments had covered 3 miles (4.8 km) to the base of the ridge forming the east side of the Our River valley, and were prepared to attack and capture the bridge at Schoenberg at 10:00 the next day. At 09:00 on the 19th, the American positions came under artillery bombardment, and the 18th Volksgrenadiers overran the 590th Field Artillery Battalion who were to provide support for the attack. The attack was launched at 10:00 anyway, but came under assault gun and anti-aircraft gunfire from armored fighting vehicles on the ridge to their front. Volksgrenadiers advanced from the flanks firing small arms. This was bad enough, but then the tanks of the Führer Begleit Brigade appeared behind them, on their way around the traffic jam at Schoenberg, it was the last straw. The Americans were under fire from all sides and running low on ammunition. At this point Colonel Descheneaux, commander of the 422 decided to surrender the American forces in the pocket. At 16:00, this surrender was formalized and the two regiments of the 106th Division and all their supporting units, approximately 7,000 men, became prisoners. A different grouping of scattered American soldiers under the command of Major Ouellette, numbering some 500 men surrendered later, but by 08:00 on 21 December, all organized resistance by American forces in the Schnee Eifel pocket ended. This marked the most extensive defeat suffered by American forces in the European Theatre.

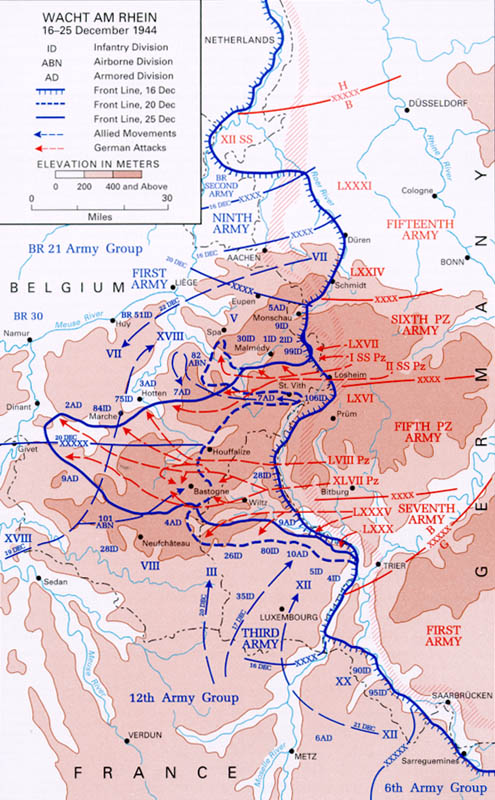
Progress of the German Ardennes counteroffensive, December 16–25, 1944.

=== The fall of St. Vith, 21 December 1944 ===
As the trap closed on the Schnee Eifel on 17 December, rapid change was occurring at the headquarters of the 106th Division in St. Vith. Brigadier general Bruce C. Clarke, leader of Combat Command-B 7th Armored Division had arrived in the morning, with news that his command was on the road to St. Vith, but would probably not arrive until later that afternoon. This was bad news for Jones, who was hoping for a quick deliverance from his problems by the arrival of organized reinforcements. The situation was not improved by the appearance of a demoralized Devine with news that German Tiger tanks were right on his heels. With the appearance of German scouts on the hills east of town, Jones decided he had had enough. “I’ve thrown in my last chips.” He told Clarke, and turned over defense of the area to Clarke. Clarke saw his first task as getting his command into St. Vith, and proceeded to the traffic jams on the Rodt – St. Vith road to force his CCB into St. Vith. By midnight of the 17th, he had managed to set up the beginnings of what was called the “horseshoe defense” of St. Vith, a line of units to the north, east and south of town. These units came mainly from the 7th and 9th Armored Divisions, but included troops from the 424th Regiment of the 106th Division, and various supporting artillery, tank, and tank destroyer battalions.

As Clarke was cursing and threatening his way through the traffic jams west of St. Vith, Model and Manteuffel were doing the same in the traffic jams east of Schoenberg. Meeting Manteuffel in the confusion, Model ordered him to capture St. Vith on the 18th, giving him control of the Fuhrer Begleit Brigade to make sure the objective would be met. It was not to be however, for the armor brigade had bogged down in the traffic jams, and the 18th and 62nd Volksgrenadiers were busy reducing the Schnee pocket and rebuilding the bridge at Steinbruck. The mechanized combat engineer battalion of the 18th Volksgrenadiers, with a group from the 1st SS Panzer, did attack from the north, but were repelled by counterattacks from the 7th and 9th Armored.

The final attack on St. Vith was belatedly launched on 21 December, but by then St. Vith had become more of a liability than an asset. Attacks from the 1st SS Panzer Division had cut the Rodt – St. Vith road, and the advance of the LVIII Panzer Corps south of St. Vith threatened to close a pincer around the entire St. Vith salient at Vielsalm, 11 miles (18 km) west of St. Vith, trapping most of the First Army. The German attack began at 15:00 with a heavy artillery barrage. The climax of the attack was, once again, the wandering German 506th Heavy Panzer Battalion. Six of these titans attacked from the Schoenberg – St. Vith road against American positions on the Prumberg. Attacking after dark at 17:00 the Tiger tanks fired star shells into American positions, blinding the defenders, and followed up with armor-piercing shells, destroying all the American defending vehicles. Around 21:30, Clarke, who had earlier stated, “This terrain is not worth a nickel an acre to me.” ordered American forces to withdraw to the west. German forces poured into the town, happily looting the remaining American supplies and equipment, in the process creating another traffic jam that prevented pursuit of the American forces.

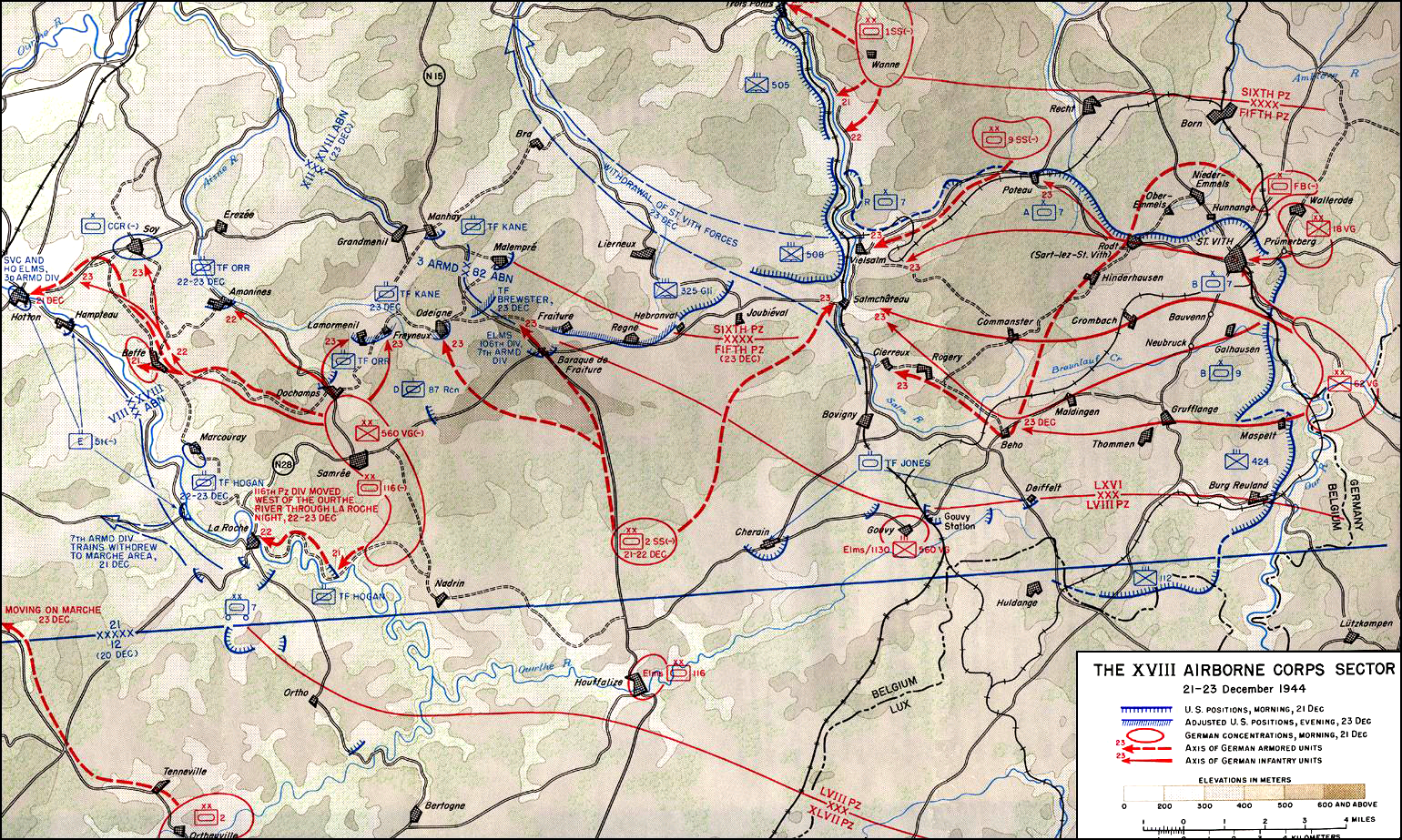
XVIII Airborne Corps Sector Map, December 21–23, 1944. The final withdrawal of American forces from the St. Vith salient.

== Aftermath ==
As the commander of CCB, I analyzed the situation and decided that the probable objective of the German attack was not just St. Vith or a bridgehead over the Salm River, but rather a decisive objective far to my rear, probably toward the English Channel. Therefore, I could well afford to be forced back slowly, surrendering a few kilometers of terrain at a time to the German forces while preventing the destruction of my command and giving other units to my rear the time to prepare a defense and a counterattack. Therefore, by retiring a kilometer or so a day, I was winning, and the Germans, by being prevented from advancing many kilometers a day, were losing – thus proving my concept that an armored force can be as effectively employed in a defense-and-delay situation as in the offensive.

— General Bruce Clarke,
ARMOR, November-December 1974

While the final battles for St. Vith were gathering momentum, the Allied high command was moving to meet the crisis. On 20 December, Field Marshal Bernard Law Montgomery – commander of the 21st Army Group – was given command of all troops north of the German advance. This was done to both improve communications and because Montgomery held an uncommitted reserve, the British XXX Corps. Also on that day, the forces of the U.S. 82nd Airborne Division, under Major General James M. Gavin, made contact with the 7th Armored Division, meeting the condition Hodges set for command of the St. Vith forces shifting to the U.S. XVIII Airborne Corps under Major General Matthew Ridgway. This was done once again to improve communications and set up a secure supply line to the rear. Ridgway arrived in Vielsalm on 22 December, shortly after American forces were driven from St. Vith. He was aware that Montgomery had already decided to withdraw from the St. Vith area. Montgomery had seen the threat of a larger encirclement of American forces, and hoped to gather a reserve west of the Meuse to finally block the German advance while also eliminating vulnerable salients in the allied lines.

The American commanders had hoped to use the St. Vith salient as the starting point of an attack towards Malmedy in Belgium. This would encircle 6th Panzer Army and destroy any hope of further German penetrations. Ridgway was still willing to consider holding positions in the area for this purpose, but interviews with the local commanders changed his mind. They had brought up many objections to securing the area: poor roads, unreliable communications and supply, severe combat losses, as well as the imminent danger of being cut off by rapidly moving panzer divisions. General William M. Hoge of the 9th Armored Division even considered it unlikely that any escape from the area could be made. Fortunately for the Americans, the weather came to their assistance for the first time in the campaign. What the Americans called a “Russian High” began blowing on 23 December. A cold wind from the northeast, and clear weather, froze the ground, allowing the free movement of tracked vehicles and the use of allied air superiority. American forces were able to escape to the southwest, cross country to Crombach, Beho, Bovigny and Vielsalm west of the Salm River. The Americans were able to outrun the panzers, and join forces with XVIII Airborne Corps by 24 December 1944.

The best summation of the fight for St. Vith was one given by the architect of the attack, Hasso von Manteuffel, for a documentary series on the battle in 1965. His analysis did not make much of the grand strategies however. His statement described the actions of the common soldier as follows:

It is the war of the small men, the outpost commanders, the section commanders, the company commanders; those were the decisive people here, who were responsible for success or failure, victory or defeat. We depended upon their courage; they could not afford to get confused, and had to act according to their own decisions, until the higher command was again in a position to take over. I believe I can say, and I have the right to make this judgment, that the Germans did this admirably well, at the same time however, I am also convinced this was the case with the American forces, who after all succeeded in upsetting the entire time schedule, not only of the attacking unit in St. Vith, but also of the 5th and 6th Panzer Armies. That is a fact which cannot be denied.

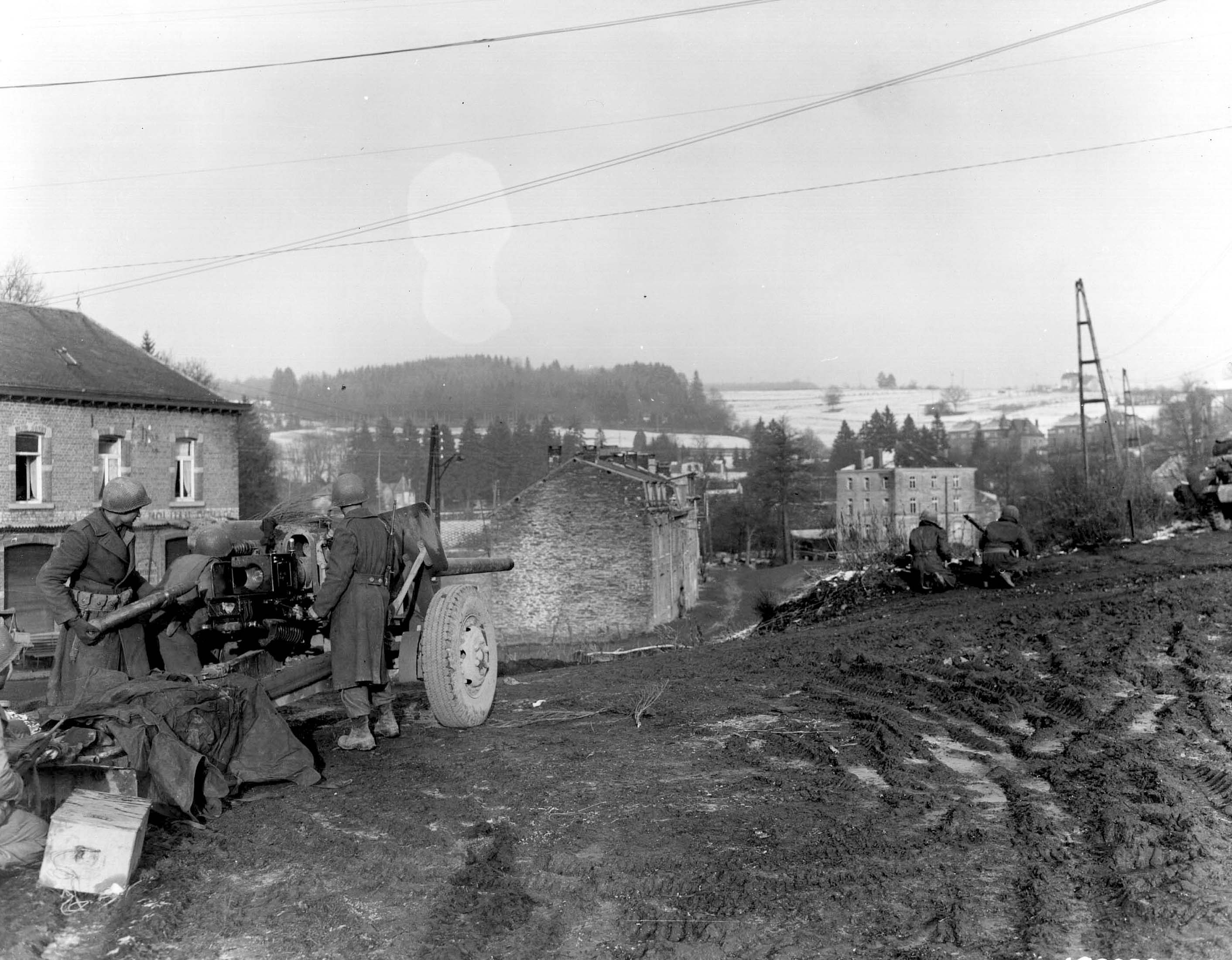
American 3-inch M5 anti-tank gun near Vielsalm, Belgium, 23 Dec 1944.

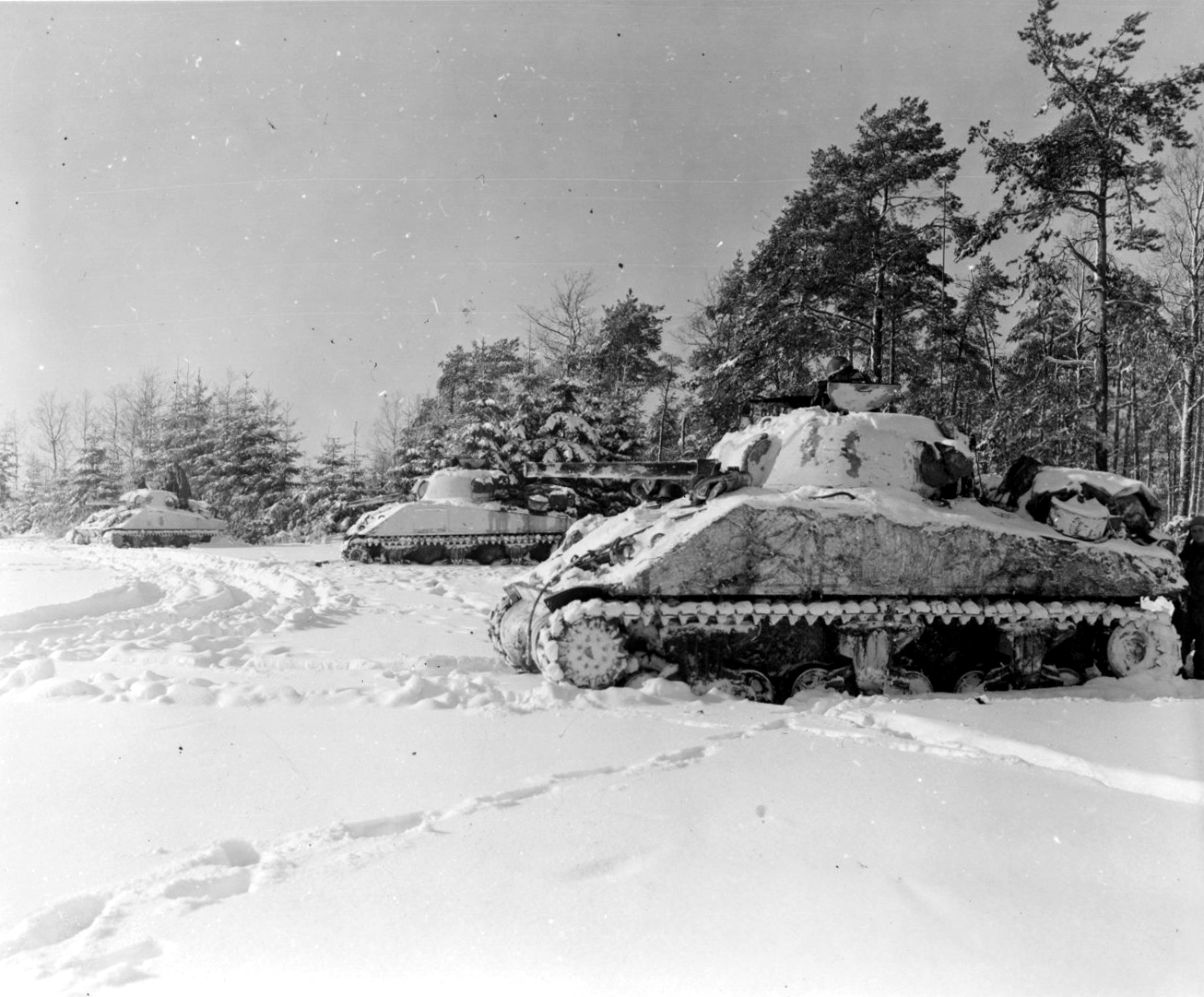
American M4 Sherman tanks in defensive positions near St. Vith.

== Documentaries ==
Documentaries

- The short film "Tried By Fire Battle of St. Vith - part I" is available for free viewing and download at the Internet Archive. The Army Pictorial Center, “Big Picture” Documentary Series (1965)
- The short film "Battle of St. Vith - part II" is available for free viewing and download at the Internet Archive. The Army Pictorial Center, “Big Picture” Documentary Series (1965)
- Battle of St. Vith - part I on YouTube The Army Pictorial Center, “Big Picture” Documentary Series (1965)
- Battle of St. Vith - part II on YouTube The Army Pictorial Center, “Big Picture” Documentary Series (1965)

== See also ==
- Battle of the Bulge
- Battle of Elsenborn Ridge
- Siege of Bastogne
- Operation Nordwind
- Colmar Pocket
- European Theatre of World War II
