= Prince Charming (disambiguation) =

Prince Charming is the stock character of fairy tales.

Prince Charming may also refer to:

== Fictional characters ==
- Prince Charming (Fables), in the comic book series Fables
- Prince Charming (Shrek), in the Shrek films
- Prince "Charming" David / David Nolan, in Once Upon a Time series

=== Disney ===
Prince Charming suits most heroes of a number of traditional Disney's version of folk tales:

- Cinderella (1950 film)
- Snow White and the Seven Dwarfs (1937 film)
- Sleeping Beauty (1959 film)

== Titled expressive works ==
- Prince Charming (album), by Adam and the Ants
- "Prince Charming" (song), a 1981 song by Adam and the Ants
- "Prince Charming", song by Metallica, from Reload
- Prince Charming (1925 film), a French silent adventure film
- Prince Charming (1942 film), a French film directed by Jean Boyer
- Prince Charming (1999 film)
- Prince Charming (2001 film)
- Prince Charming (manga)
- Prince Charming, the autobiography of Christopher Logue
- Prince Charming, novel by Rachel Hawkins
- Prince Charming (TV series), a German reality dating show
- "Prince Charming" (Doctors), a 2004 television episode

== See also ==
- Finding Prince Charming, an American TV show
