= Prince Charming (TV series) =

German reality dating show

- Genre: Dating game show
- Presented by: The Big Reunion: Angela Finger-Erben (1); Lola Weippert (2–)
- Starring: Prince Charming: Nicolas Puschmann (1); Alexander Schäfer (2); Kim Tränka (3); Fabian Fuchs (4)
- Narrated by: Thorsten Schorn
- Opening theme: "Gotta Let Go" - Hypanda, IA
- Country of origin: Germany
- Original language: German
- No. of seasons: 4
- No. of episodes: 29

Production
- Running time: 75-80 Minutes
- Production companies: Seapoint Productions GmbH & Co. KG

Original release
- Network: RTL+
- Release: 30 October 2019 – present
- Network: VOX
- Release: 20 April 2020 – present

Prince Charming is a German reality dating show that premiered on 30 October 2019, streaming on premium sector of RTL+ and began airing on 20 April 2020, on television on VOX. The concept of the show is modeled after Der Bachelor, but with gay men and instead of having a rose ceremony, it features a black tie ceremony.

The second season began streaming on 12 October 2020, on RTL+ and began airing on television on 19 October 2020, on VOX. On 23 November 2020, the show was extended for a third season, which began streaming on 17 August 2021, on RTL+ and on television on 7 February 2022, on VOX. It was renewed for a fourth season on 5 October 2021.

In May 2021, the lesbian offshoot Princess Charming launched on RTL+ and in October 2021 premiered on VOX.

== Production ==
RTL announced a gay dating show for the first time in late June 2019 and called for application as a candidate. On 2 October 2019, it was announced that Prince Charming will be on display from 30 October 2019, to RTL+. Nicolas Puschmann was also named as the first Prince. Janine Jannes, communications manager at RTL+, said that Prince Charming was planned as a RTL+ original from the start. As of 21 October launched a RTL+ designed by BDA Creative marketing campaign with teaser videos in which terms such as dating, love, romance were called gay (Example sentence: "Dating is gay"). Thomas Huber, marketing director at Mediengruppe RTL Deutschland explains this use of the word as follows: "Unfortunately, the word 'gay' is still used in a derogatory way by some people - we want to change that and finally give the term back the positive meaning it deserves."

From 30 October to 18 December 2019, the eight regular episodes of the season and, following the finale, a reunion episode, moderated by Angela Finger-Erben, were published in the premium area of RTL+. On Black Friday, 29 November 2019, which RTL+ called "Black FriGay", the first five episodes that had been released by then could be seen free of charge. When the final of the first season was published, RTL Group announced that the show will broadcast on 2020 in the free-TV from VOX. Following the announcement of the Grimmprice-award on 3 March, the RTL media group announced the date for the free TV premiere: the first season will begin airing on 20 April 2020, every Mondays at 10:15 p.m.

With the Black FriGay event, the extension for a second season was announced. On 31 January 2020, the production company Seapoint called on to apply as a candidate for the second season. The second season should be rotated for publication on RTL+ in July, as evidenced by the first in late April 2020 COVID-19 pandemic was not possible. Production by Seapoint then took place in August. On 4 August, the 29-year-old marketing manager Alexander Schäfer from Frankfurt am Main was announced as the second Prince. He should have only been a candidate in April. On 1 October 2020, was announced, that from 12 October 2020, would publish on RTL+ and from 26 October 2020, would broadcast on VOX. The Black FriGay for the second season took place on 27 November 2020.

On 23 November 2020, the show was extended for a third season, for which the casting began. The 31-year-old automotive salesman Kim Tränka from Bremen was introduced as the third Prince Charming on 27 April 2021. The third season of 10 episodes with 18 candidates was broadcast on RTL+ from 17 August – 19 October 2021. On VOX it was broadcast from 7 February – 28 March 2022.

On 5 October 2021, it was renewed for a fourth season.

== Format ==
Prince Charming is the first international branch of the United States mission Finding Prince Charming from the year 2016. Both are a version of the Bachelor-Formats with a gay man as Prince, the basis of group and individual dates attempts among the candidates love to Find. For the sorting out of candidates there is the Bachelor- "Night of the Roses" a so-called "Gentlemen's Night" with black ties instead of flowers. In the first, the candidates who are allowed to stay receive ties; In the following nights, the leaving candidates must return their ties, while the remaining candidates may keep their ties or be asked if they would like to keep them on.

== Seasons ==
Season	Original run		Prince	Winner	Runner-up	Still together	Relationship notes
Season	RTL+	VOX	Prince	Winner	Runner-up	Still together	Relationship notes
1	30 October 2019 – 18 December 2019	20 April 2020 – 8 June 2020	Nicolas Puschmann	Lars Tönsfeuerborn	Dominic Smith	No	In the reunion, Puschmann and Tönsfeuerborn announced that they are still a couple and will move in together. In November 2020, Puschmann and Tönsfeuerborn broke up. In September 2021, the separation took place again.
2	12 October 2020 – 14 December 2020	26 October 2020 – 21 December 2020	Alexander Schäfer	Lauritz Hofmann	Vincent	No	Schäfer and Hofmann didn't become a couple, after filming the final.
3	17 August 2021 – 19 October 2021	7 February 2022 – 28 March 2022	Kim Tränka	Maurice Schmitz	Robin Solf	No	Tränka and Schmitz were still together as of the reunion episode in October 2021. In June 2022, Tränka and Schmitz broke up.
4	29 September 2022 – 1 December 2022	—N/a	Fabian Fuchs	Sebastian	Tim Hornbyl	No	Fuchs and Sebastian didn't become a couple, after filming the final.

== Reception ==
=== Critical reception ===
Prince Charming was received positively in the criticism and compared to Bachelor-formats as better. Thus Prince Nicolas Puschmann referred by Anja Rützel to Spiegel Online as the better bachelor (prince). Janna Specken for T-online.de offers five reasons why Prince Charming is better than the Bachelor; for her, Puschmann is the coolest Bachelor (Prince) and she finds the candidates dazzlingly different and very entertaining. In Neon is judged the show was worth more than the bachelor and is the best dating format of all time. Alexander Krei from DWDL.de thinks that the concept feels familiar and that it is a good thing. The first gay dating show is ultimately nothing more than a dating show. "You can find it all terribly mundane and predictable - or just get involved and have fun with the show. This also arises because the "Bachelor" -experienced makers of "Prince Charming" fortunately refrained from portraying the love between two men as something extraordinary." Focus Online editor Tobias Suchanek writes explicitly as a straight man, for him the show is more than just entertainment, it is almost like a documentary, because he is presented with a social scene with which he otherwise has nothing to do in life, and thus his horizons are broadened. For the gay and lesbian internet magazine queer.de, the show is surprisingly entertaining and perfect for binge watching on cold winter days; The selection of the prince and the candidates in particular receive praise.

In interviews, Puschmann reports positive feedback from viewers about the outing stories of the participants and about the fact that he lives out being gay and shows how people dared to come out in their environment because of the show, or others who rejected them have changed attitudes towards homosexuality.

=== Audience numbers ===
The RTL media group did not publish any viewer numbers for the show, but described it as their most successful RTL+ reality original to date. According to a report in September 2021, the third season became the most successful season with a 30% increase in viewers compared to the second season.

== Awards and nominations ==
Year	Award	Category	Nominee	Result	Ref
2020	Grimme-Preis 2020	Entertainment	Nicolas Puschmann (protagonist), Nina Klink (production), Jan Graefe zu Baringdorf & Nora Kauven (executive producer)	Won	
2020	Deutscher Fernsehpreis	Best Entertainment Reality	Prince Charming	Nominated	
