= 271st Infantry Division =

German infantry division during World War II

The 271st Infantry Division (German: 271. Infanterie-Division) was an infantry division of the German Heer during World War II.

In total, three infantry formations used the ordinal number 271 within the Wehrmacht. The first 271st Infantry Division's deployment was aborted in May 1940, whereas the second iteration of the division saw its deployment completed in November 1943 and was destroyed in August 1944. Subsequently, a division designated 271st Volksgrenadier Division (German: 271. Volks-Grenadier-Division) was deployed in August 1944 and remained in combat until 1945.

== History ==
=== First planned deployment, 1940 ===
Initially, a division named 271st Infantry Division was assembled starting on 1 July 1940, following a directive of 22 May. After the German-French armistice, the assembly of the division was interrupted on 22 July. The division was planned to consist of the Infantry Regiments 562, 563, and 564, as well as the Artillery Detachment 271 and the Division Units 271.

=== Second deployment, 1943 – 1944 ===
Another formation named 271st Infantry Division was assembled as part of the twenty-second Aufstellungswelle on 17 November 1943 in the occupied Netherlands under the supervision of Oberbefehlshaber West. It consisted of the Grenadier Regiments 977, 978, and 979, as well as the Division Fusilier Battalion 271, and the Artillery Regiment 271. The personnel divisional staff and the 979th Regiment were provided by the 137th Infantry Division, whereas the 113th Infantry Division provided the men of the 977th Regiment, 271st Artillery Regiment and the 271st Division Fusilier Battalion, and the 102nd Infantry Division provided the personnel of the 978th Regiment.

The division was destroyed in August 1944 in the Falaise Pocket in Normandy, while under the supervision of the 5th Panzer Army.

The 271st Infantry Division was commanded by Paul Danhauser between 10 December 1943 and its destruction in the Falaise Pocket.

=== 271st Volksgrenadier Division, 1944 – 1945 ===
On 25 August 1944, the 576th Volksgrenadier Division was deployed in Slovakia. This formation was redesignated 271st Volksgrenadier Division on 17 September 1944. It consisted of the reassembled Grenadier Regiments 977, 978, and 979 (previously Grenadier Regiments 1186, 1187, and 1188), as well as the Artillery Regiment 271, formerly Artillery Regiment 1576.

Unlike the 271st Infantry Division, the 271st Volksgrenadier Division was sent to the Eastern Front and was deployed to the defense against the Soviet-Romanian Budapest Offensive.

After Grenadier Regiment 978 saw combat in the Budapest area, the division was refreshed at Nitra in February 1945. The 271st Volksgrenadier Division was subsequently captured by Red Army forces in Moravia in May 1945.

Throughout its service, the 271st Volksgrenadier Division was commanded by Martin Bieber, who was appointed on 3 September 1944. Bieber was taken prisoner by the Red Army along his division in May 1945 and remained in Soviet captivity until 1955.

== Superior formations ==
Organizational chart of the 271st Infantry Division and the 271st Volksgrenadier Division
Year	Month	Army Corps	Army	Army Group	Area
271st Infantry Division, November 1943 – August 1944
1943	December	LXXXVIII Army Corps	WBF Niederlande	Army Group D	Netherlands
1944	January	LXXXVIII Army Corps	WBF Niederlande	Army Group D	Netherlands
1944	February	LXII Reserve Corps	None.	Army Group D	Besançon
1944	March – April	IV Luftwaffe Field Corps	19th Army	Army Group D	Montpellier
1944	May – June	IV Luftwaffe Field Corps	19th Army	Army Group G	Montpellier
1944	July	II SS Panzer Corps	Panzer Group West	Army Group B	Normandy
1944	August	LXXIV Army Corps	5th Panzer Army	Army Group B	Falaise Pocket
1944	September	Unable to fight, remnants sent to the Replacement Army.			
271st Volksgrenadier Division, September 1944 – May 1945
1944	October – November	Deployment.			Trnava, Slovakia
1944	December	LXXII Army Corps	Hungarian 3rd Army	Army Group South	Stuhlweißenburg
1945	January	III Army Corps	6th Army	Army Group South	Budapest
1945	February – March	Panzer Corps Feldherrnhalle	8th Army	Army Group South	Esztergom
1945	April	LXXII Army Corps	8th Army	Army Group South	Moravia
1945	May	XXXXIX Mountain Corps	1st Panzer Army	Army Group Center	Moravia

== Noteworthy individuals ==
- Paul Danhauser, divisional commander of the 271st Infantry Division.
- Martin Bieber, divisional commander of the 271st Volksgrenadier Division.
