= Prince Charming (TV series) season 4 =

Prince Charming
- Season 4
- Starring: Fabian Fuchs
- No. of episodes: 10

Release
- Original network: RTL+
- Original release: September 29 – December 1, 2023

Season chronology
- ← Previous; Season 3

The fourth season of reality television series Prince Charming premiered on September 29, 2023 on the premium section of streaming service RTL+. The fourth Prince Charming was 33-year-old internet company manager Fabian Fuchs.

The season ended on December 1, 2023, with 23-year-old Sebastian being named the winner. At the reunion, Fuchs and Sebastian revealed that they did not become a couple.

== Filming ==
The fourth season of Prince Charming was shot on the Greek island of Rhodes.

== Contestants ==
This season featured 21 contestants.

| Name | Age | Hometown | Outcome | Place |
|---|---|---|---|---|
| Sebastian | 23 | Bielefeld | Winner | 1 |
| Tim Hornbyl | 25 | Lucerne | Runner-up | 2 |
| Dennis S. | 27 | Bergisch Gladbach | Week 8 | 3-4 |
| Philippe Van Thomas | 29 | St. Vith | Week 8 | 3-4 |
| Alexander | 31 | Duisburg | Week 7 | 5 |
| Leon | 22 | Maastricht | Week 7 | 6-7 (quit) |
| Dennis O. | 28 | Berlin | Week 7 | 6-7 (quit) |
| Nico | 25 | Munich | Week 6 | 8 |
| Joel | 24 | Essen | Week 6 | 9 (quit) |
| Manuel B. | 34 | Mainz | Week 5 | 10-11 |
| Marcus | 27 | Munich | Week 5 | 10-11 |
| Alessandro | 29 | Dottikon | Week 4 | 12-14 |
| Marcel | 24 | Hamburg | Week 4 | 12-14 |
| Srira | 29 | Cologne | Week 4 | 12-14 |
| Jonny | 26 | Munich | Week 3 | 15-16 |
| Sam | 23 | Cologne | Week 3 | 15-16 |
| Alex | 31 | Berlin | Week 2 | 17-18 |
| Phil | 25 | Berlin | Week 2 | 17-18 |
| Manuel K. | 33 | Cologne | Week 1 | 19-21 |
| Niko | 23 | Berlin | Week 1 | 19-21 |
| Thomas | 33 | Salzburg | Week 1 | 19-21 |

== Contestant Progress ==
| Contestants | Episode/Week | | | | | | | | | |
| Contestants | 1 | 2 | 3 | 4 | 5 | 6 | 7 | 8 | 9 | Reunion |
|---|---|---|---|---|---|---|---|---|---|---|
| Sebastian | IN | IN | IN | IN | IN | IN | IN | IN | WINNER | Guest |
| Tim Hornbyl | IN | IN | IN | IN | IN | IN | IN | IN | ELIM | Guest |
| Dennis S. | IN | IN | IN | IN | IN | IN | IN | ELIM | | Guest |
| Philippe Van Thomas | IN | IN | IN | IN | IN | IN | IN | ELIM | | Guest |
| Alexander | IN | IN | IN | IN | IN | IN | ELIM | | | |
| Leon | IN | IN | IN | IN | IN | IN | QUIT | | | |
| Dennis O. | IN | IN | IN | IN | IN | IN | QUIT | | | Guest |
| Nico | IN | IN | IN | IN | IN | ELIM | | | | |
| Joel | IN | IN | IN | IN | IN | QUIT | | | | |
| Manuel B. | IN | IN | IN | IN | ELIM | | | | | |
| Marcus | IN | IN | IN | IN | ELIM | | | | | |
| Alessandro | IN | IN | IN | ELIM | | | | | | |
| Marcel | IN | IN | IN | ELIM | | | | | | |
| Srira | IN | IN | IN | ELIM | | | | | | |
| Jonny | IN | IN | ELIM | | | | | | | |
| Sam | IN | IN | ELIM | | | | | | | |
| Alex | IN | ELIM | | | | | | | | |
| Phil | IN | ELIM | | | | | | | | |
| Manuel K. | ELIM | | | | | | | | | |
| Niko | ELIM | | | | | | | | | |
| Thomas | ELIM | | | | | | | | | |

The contestant went on a Group date with the Prince.
After the Group date, the contestant went on a date with the Prince.
The contestant went on a date with the Prince.
The contestant stayed a night together with the Prince.
The contestant quit the competition.
The contestant had to give up his tie and was eliminated.
The contestant was the runner up.
The contestant won Prince Charming.
