= Gerhard Franz =

- Born: 26 February 1902; Bobeck, Landratsamt Roda, Saxe-Weimar-Eisenach, German Empire
- Died: 24 December 1975 (aged 73); Bad Wildungen, Hesse, West Germany
- Military career
- Allegiance: German Empire; Weimar Republic; Nazi Germany
- Branch: Reichswehr; Army
- Service years: 1919–1945
- Rank: Generalmajor
- Commands: 256. Volksgrenadier-Division
- Conflicts: World War II
- Awards: Knight's Cross of the Iron Cross

Gerhard Paul Franz (26 February 1902 – 24 December 1975) was a German general in the Wehrmacht during World War II. He was a recipient of the Knight's Cross of the Iron Cross of Nazi Germany.

== Awards and decorations ==
- Wehrmacht Long Service Award, 4th to 2nd Class
- Sudetenland Medal
- Iron Cross (1939), 2nd and 1st Class
  - 2nd Class on 29 September 1939
  - 1st Class on 29 May 1940
- Eastern Front Medal
- Medal for the Italo-German campaign in Africa
- Africa Cuff Band
- Knight's Cross of the Iron Cross on 24 July 1941 as Oberstleutnant i. G. and Chief of Operations (Ia) of the 29. Infanterie-Division
- German Cross in Gold on 14 February 1944 as Oberst i. G. and Chief of the General Staff of the XXXXII. Armeekorps

== Notes ==
Military offices
Preceded by None	Commander of 256. Volksgrenadier-Division; 17 September 1944 – 8 April 1945	Succeeded by Generalmajor Fritz Warnecke
