= Robert Sepúlveda Jr. =

Puerto Rican LGBTQ rights activist

- Born: San Juan, Puerto Rico
- Education: The Art Institute of Fort Lauderdale
- Occupations: Interior Designer; Founder and President of the Atlanta Rainbow Crosswalks; Creative Director; LGBTQ Activist
- Known for: Finding Prince Charming
- Height: 6 ft 2 in (1.88 m)

Robert Sepúlveda Jr. is a Puerto Rican former fashion model, interior designer and creative director.

== Early life and education ==
He was born in San Juan, Puerto Rico. He grew up in Lake City, Florida where he attended Columbia High School. He received his degree in interior design from The Art Institute of Fort Lauderdale, graduating summa cum laude. During his college years Sepúlveda Jr. worked as an escort to pay his way through college and to pay his rent. He also appeared on (and won) an episode of the MTV dating show Room Raiders.

== Career ==
Sepúlveda began his career at Valley Forge Fabrics, a supplier of decorative upholstery fabrics for the hospitality industry. There, he created and executed interior design schemes for hoteliers. In 2008 Sepúlveda moved to New York City where he began working with fashion houses Polo Ralph Lauren, Rugby Ralph Lauren, Lacoste, and Kenneth Cole, eventually assuming the role of acting Global Visual Manager of the Calvin Klein Home Collection. Sepúlveda has since founded RSJdesign, LLC, his interior design firm specializing in luxury residential and commercial spaces.

== Finding Prince Charming ==
In September 2016, Sepúlveda Jr. starred on the dating show Finding Prince Charming, which airs on the network Logo. The series depicted Sepúlveda Jr. getting to know thirteen gay men and each week he has to eliminate 1 in a ceremony. The show shares the similar format to The Bachelor, however it is the first all gay-cast dating show. Prior to the series airing, controversy arose surrounding Sepúlveda Jr with his past work as an escort being revealed and his personal videos were released by an ex-partner. Logo has spoken out on that matter claiming they were fully aware of his history and explained that the series is reality and consists of many discussions such as "first time love to coming to terms with one’s past, fear of commitment and even HIV."

== Activism ==
In 2015, Sepúlveda worked with the city of Atlanta with a proposal to launch the Atlanta Rainbow Crosswalks.
