= List of protected heritage sites in Sankt-Vith =

This table shows an overview of the protected heritage sites in the Walloon town Sankt-Vith. This list is part of Belgium's national heritage.

Object	Year/architect	Town/section	Address	Coordinates	Number	Image
Mother of God Church in Neundorf ^{(nl)} ^{(de)}		Crombach Sankt Vith		50.267573°N 6.092467°E	31033 Info	Mother of God Church in Neundorf
Old school: the walls and roof, except that part built in 1911, the vaulted cellar, its stairs and spring ^{(nl)} ^{(de)}		Sankt Vith		50.304237°N 6.103519°E	31035 Info	Old school: the walls and roof, except that part built in 1911, the vaulted cellar, its stairs and spring
Church St. Aldegundis: tower with its onion-dome and neighboring buildings from the 18th century, the choir with windows, roof, pillars, columns and pilasters ^{(nl)} ^{(de)}		Sankt Vith		50.334974°N 6.043348°E	31037 Info	Church St. Aldegundis: tower with its onion-dome and neighboring buildings from the 18th century, the choir with windows, roof, pillars, columns and pilasters
Maria Chapel ^{(nl)} ^{(de)}		Sankt Vith		50.337611°N 6.044053°E	31038 Info	Maria Chapel
Bakery ^{(nl)} ^{(de)}		Sankt Vith		50.325308°N 6.060021°E	31036 Info	Bakery
Sheep Bridge (Schapenbrug) ^{(nl)} ^{(de)}		Sankt Vith		50.333134°N 6.036273°E	31039 Info	Sheep Bridge (Schapenbrug)
Rodter Buchen ^{(nl)} ^{(de)}		Sankt Vith		50.288883°N 6.059663°E	31050 Info	Rodter Buchen
Saint Anthony's Church tower and choir ^{(nl)} ^{(de)}		Sankt Vith		50.259251°N 6.068384°E	31026 Info	Saint Anthony's Church tower and choir
St. Lawrence Church and Vrijthof wall in Mackenbach ^{(nl)} ^{(de)}		Sankt Vith		50.283690°N 6.229179°E	31034 Info	St. Lawrence Church and Vrijthof wall in Mackenbach
Büchelturm tower gate ^{(nl)} ^{(de)}		Sankt Vith		50.279658°N 6.124843°E	31040 Info	Büchelturm tower gate
Antoniusbaum area ^{(nl)} ^{(de)}		Sankt Vith		50.279986°N 6.187193°E	31049 Info	Antoniusbaum area
Castle Wallerode (walls and roof) ^{(nl)} ^{(de)}		Recht Sankt Vith		50.296960°N 6.155279°E	31003 Info	Castle Wallerode (walls and roof)
St. Bartholomew's Chapel in Wiesenbach with 13 linden trees, cemetery and wall ^{(nl)} ^{(de)}		Lommersweiler Sankt Vith	Wiesenbach	50.265022°N 6.141518°E	30998 Info	St. Bartholomew's Chapel in Wiesenbach with 13 linden trees, cemetery and wall
The Belgian-Prussian border markers 93-111 (several municipalities) ^{(nl)} ^{(de)}		Sankt Vith		50.308639°N 6.013061°E	31215 Info	
Tumulus Schinkelsknopf ^{(nl)} ^{(de)}		Sankt Vith Sankt Vith		50.253305°N 6.113399°E	31299 Info	Tumulus Schinkelsknopf
Burial mound "An bzw. Auf der Lie" ^{(nl)} ^{(de)}		Sankt Vith		50.265386°N 6.103370°E	31490 Info	Burial mound "An bzw. Auf der Lie"

== See also ==
- Lists of protected heritage sites in the German-speaking Community of Belgium
- List of protected heritage sites in Liège (province)
- Sankt-Vith
