= Prince Charming (TV series) season 1 =

Season of Prince Charming

Prince Charming
- Season 1
- Starring: Nicolas Puschmann
- No. of episodes: 9

Release
- Original network: RTL+ (stream); VOX (television)
- Original release: RTL+ October 30 – December 18, 2019; VOX; April 20 – June 8, 2020

Season chronology
- Next → Season 2

The first season of the reality television series Prince Charming premiered on October 30, 2019, streaming on premium sector of RTL+ and began airing on television on April 20, 2020, on VOX. The first Prince Charming was 28-year-old account manager Nicolas Puschmann.

The season enden on December 18, 2019 (RTL+) and on June 8, 2020 (VOX), and Lars Tönsfeuerborn was initially named the winner. In the reunion, Puschmann and Tönsfeuerborn announced that they are still a couple and will move in together. In November 2020, both announced that they had split up. At the end of January 2021, Puschmann and Tönsfeuerborn confirmed that they were a couple again but would like to keep their relationship largely out of the public eye in the future. In September 2021 they separated again.

== Filming ==
The first season of Prince Charming was shot in Greece in Crete in September 2019.

== Contestants ==
This season was featured 20 contestants.

Name	Age	Hometown	Outcome	Place
Lars Tönsfeuerborn	29	Düsseldorf	Winner	1
Dominic Smith	31	Berlin	Runner-up	2
Andreas Kürner	30	Lübeck	Week 7	3-4
Aaron Königs	24	Köln	Week 7	3-4
Alexander Gutbrod	38	Remseck	Week 6	5-6
Simon Goga	32	Köln	Week 6	5-6
Manuel Flickinger	31	Limburgerhof	Week 5	7
Martin Angelo	26	Hamburg	Week 5	8-9 (quit)
Kiril Galabinov	33	Köln	Week 5	8-9 (quit)
Marco Tornese	35	Zürich	Week 4	10-11
Pascal Büchel	27	Wien	Week 4	10-11
Sam Dylan	28	Cloppenburg	Week 4	12 (quit)
Antonio Sosic	26	Wien	Week 3	13-15
Sebastian H.	33	München	Week 3	13-15
Adrian M.	38	München	Week 3	13-15
John R.	34	London	Week 2	16-17
Dominik Lassnig	29	Wien	Week 2	16-17
Daniel Meurer	31	Köln	Week 1	18-20
Robert Rottensteiner	29	Berlin	Week 1	18-20
Robin Eichinger	27	Mainz	Week 1	18-20

== Contestant Progress ==
Contestants	Episode/Week							
Contestants	1	2	3	4	5	6	7	8
Lars	IN	IN	IN	IN	IN	IN	IN	WINNER
Dominic	IN	IN	IN	IN	IN	IN	IN	ELIM
Andreas	IN	IN	IN	IN	IN	IN	ELIM	
Aaron	IN	IN	IN	IN	IN	IN	ELIM	
Alexander	IN	IN	IN	IN	IN	ELIM		
Simon	IN	IN	IN	IN	IN	ELIM		
Manuel	IN	IN	IN	IN	ELIM			
Martin	IN	IN	IN	IN	QUIT			
Kiril	IN	IN	IN	IN	QUIT			
Marco	IN	IN	IN	ELIM				
Pascal	IN	IN	IN	ELIM				
Sam	IN	IN	IN	QUIT				
Antonio	IN	IN	ELIM					
Sebastian	IN	IN	ELIM					
Adrian	IN	IN	ELIM					
John	IN	ELIM						
Dominik	IN	ELIM						
Daniel	ELIM							
Robert	ELIM							
Robin	ELIM							

The contestant went on a Group date with the Prince.
The contestant went after the Group date, he went alone on a date with the Prince.
The contestant stayed a night together with the Prince.
The contestant quit the competition.
The contestant had to give up his tie and was eliminated.
The contestant was the runner up.
The contestant won Prince Charming.
