= Prince Charming (TV series) season 3 =

Season of Prince Charming

Prince Charming
- Season 3
- Starring: Kim Tränka
- No. of episodes: 10

Release
- Original network: RTL+ (stream); VOX (television)
- Original release: RTL+ August 17 – October 19, 2021; VOX; February 7 – March 28, 2022

Season chronology
- ← Previous; Season 2 Next → Season 4

The third season of reality television series Prince Charming premiered on August 17, 2021 on the premium section of streaming service RTL+. This season, like the previous two, was shown on German TV channel VOX, which began airing on February 7, 2022. The third Prince Charming was 31-year-old car salesman Kim Tränka.

The season ended on October 19, 2021 (RTL+) and on March 28, 2022 (VOX), with 22-year-old Maurice Schmitz being named the winner. At the reunion, Tränka and Schmitz revealed that they were still a couple.

== Filming ==
The third season of Prince Charming, just like the previous two, was shot on the Greek island of Crete in early 2021.

== Contestants ==
This season featured 18 contestants.

Name	Age	Hometown	Outcome	Place
Maurice Schmitz	22	Cologne	Winner	1
Robin Solf	23	Berlin	Runner-up	2
Thomas Hanisch	30	Berlin	Week 8	3
Max Rogall	25	Berlin	Week 7	4
Jan Windisch	26	Vienna	Week 7	5 (quit)
Bon Markel	28	Munich	Week 6	6-7
Manfred Karacsonyi	33	Hamburg	Week 6	6-7
Kevin Schäfer	32	Cologne	Week 5	8
Arne Bruns	40	Bremerhaven	Week 5	9 (quit)
Pascal Lobert	24	Iserlohn	Week 4	10-12
Jean-Cédric Sow	30	Stuttgart	Week 4	10-12
Felix Krupka	24	Herbolzheim	Week 4	10-12
Florian	34	Munich	Week 3	13
Corey Kuhlo	33	Berlin	Week 3	14 (quit)
Ash Snell	27	Berlin	Week 2	15-16
Lukas Frehse	23	Hamburg	Week 2	15-16
Markus Lugl	32	Nordendorf	Week 1	17
Patrick Elsner	30	Vienna	Week 1	18 (quit)

== Contestant Progress ==
Contestants	Episode/Week									
Contestants	1	2	3	4	5	6	7	8	9	Reunion
Maurice Schmitz	IN	IN	IN	IN	IN	IN	IN	IN	WINNER	Guest
Robin Solf	IN	IN	IN	IN	IN	IN	IN	IN	ELIM	Guest
Thomas Hanisch	IN	IN	IN	IN	IN	IN	IN	ELIM		Guest
Max Rogall	IN	IN	IN	IN	IN	IN	ELIM			Guest
Jan Windisch	IN	IN	IN	IN	IN	IN	QUIT			Guest
Bon Markel	IN	IN	IN	IN	IN	ELIM				
Manfred Karacsonyi	IN	IN	IN	IN	IN	ELIM				Guest
Kevin Schäfer	IN	IN	IN	IN	ELIM					
Arne Bruns	IN	IN	IN	IN	QUIT					Guest
Pascal Lobert	IN	IN	IN	ELIM						
Jean-Cédric Sow	IN	IN	IN	ELIM						
Felix Krupka	IN	IN	IN	ELIM						
Florian	IN	IN	ELIM							
Corey Kuhlo	IN	IN	QUIT							
Ash Snell	IN	ELIM								
Lukas Frehse	IN	ELIM								
Markus Lugl	ELIM									
Patrick Elsner	QUIT									

The contestant went on a Group date with the Prince.
After the Group date, the contestant went on a date with the Prince.
The contestant went on a date with the Prince.
The contestant stayed a night together with the Prince.
The contestant quit the competition.
The contestant had to give up his tie and was eliminated.
The contestant was the runner up.
The contestant won Prince Charming.
