= Prince Charming (TV series) season 2 =

Season of television series

Prince Charming
- Season 2
- Starring: Alexander Schäfer
- No. of episodes: 10

Release
- Original network: RTL+ (stream); VOX (television)
- Original release: RTL+ 12 October 2020 – 14 December 2020; VOX 26 October 2020 – 21 December 2020

Season chronology
- ← Previous; Season 1 Next → Season 3

The second season of the reality television series Prince Charming premiered on 12 October 2020 streaming on premium sector of RTL+ and began airing on television on 26 October 2020 on VOX. The second Prince Charming was 29-year-old marketing manager Alexander Schäfer from Frankfurt.

The season ended on 14 December 2020 (RTL+) and on 21 December 2020 (VOX), and Lauritz Hofmann was initially named the winner. In the reunion, Schäfer and Hofmann announced that they didn't become a couple, after filming the final.

== Filming ==
Like in the first season, also the second season of Prince Charming was shot in Greece in Crete in August 2020.

== Contestants ==
This season was featured 20 contestants.

Name	Age	Hometown	Outcome	Place
Lauritz Hofmann	27	Frankfurt	Winner	1
Vincent	23	London	Runner-up	2
Gino Bormann	32	Berlin	Week 8	3-4
Jakob Koslowsky	29	Dortmund	Week 8	3-4
Andrea Lamanna	24	Bayreuth	Week 7	5-7
Arne Szalay	25	Heidelberg	Week 7	5-7
Michael LaDelle	39	Zürich	Week 7	5-7
Jan Maik Baumann	30	Zürich	Week 6	8-9 (quit)
Joachim	29	Schwechat	Week 6	8-9 (quit)
Adrian Saraç	25	Berlin	Week 5	10-12
David Lovric	24	Cologne	Week 5	10-12
Roman Elyas	32	Cologne	Week 5	10-12
Florian Kunze-Forrest	39	Berlin	Week 4	13-14
Sascha Vaegs	30	Cologne	Week 4	13-14
Bastian Castillo	30	Berlin	Week 3	15-16
Benedetto Paterno	27	Cologne	Week 3	15-16
Bernhard Kusznierz	30	Düsseldorf	Week 2	17-18
Patrick Behm	32	Frankfurt	Week 2	17-18
Erik	31	Hamburg	Week 1	19-20
Leon	32	Zürich	Week 1	19-20

== Contestant Progress ==
Contestants	Episode/Week								
Contestants	1	2	3	4	5	6	7	8	9
Lauritz	IN	IN	IN	IN	IN	IN	IN	IN	WINNER
Vincent	IN	IN	IN	IN	IN	IN	IN	IN	ELIM
Gino	IN	IN	IN	IN	IN	IN	IN	ELIM	
Jakob	IN	IN	IN	IN	IN	IN	IN	ELIM	
Andrea	IN	IN	IN	IN	IN	IN	ELIM		
Arne	IN	IN	IN	IN	IN	IN	ELIM		
Michael	IN	IN	IN	IN	IN	IN	ELIM		
Jan	IN	IN	IN	IN	IN	QUIT			
Joachim	IN	IN	IN	IN	IN	QUIT			
Adrian	IN	IN	IN	IN	ELIM				
David	IN	IN	IN	IN	ELIM				
Roman	IN	IN	IN	IN	ELIM				
Florian	IN	IN	IN	ELIM					
Sascha	IN	IN	IN	ELIM					
Bastian	IN	IN	ELIM						
Benedetto	IN	IN	ELIM						
Bernhard	IN	ELIM							
Patrick	IN	ELIM							
Erik	ELIM								
Leon	ELIM								

The contestant had to give up his tie and was eliminated.
The contestant was the runner up.
The contestant won Prince Charming.

== Episodes ==
=== Episode 1 ===
Original airdate:
RTL+: 12 October 2020
VOX: 26 October 2020

Event	Description
Black tie ceremony	Erik and Leon had to give their tie back and were eliminated.

=== Episode 2 ===
Original airdate:
RTL+: 19 October 2020
VOX: 2 November 2020

Event	Description
Group date	Gino, Jakob, Lauritz, Michael and Patrick
Single date	Lauritz
Black tie ceremony	Bernhard and Patrick had to give their tie back and were eliminated.

=== Episode 3 ===
Original airdate:
RTL+: 26 October 2020
VOX: 9 November 2020

Event	Description
Group date	Andrea, David, Florian, Jan and Sascha
Single date	Andrea
Black tie ceremony	Bastian and Benedetto had to give their tie back and were eliminated.

=== Episode 4 ===
Original airdate:
RTL+: 2 November 2020
VOX: 16 November 2020

Event	Description
Group date	Arne, Vincent, Adrian and Roman
Single date	Joachim
Black tie ceremony	Florian and Sascha had to give their tie back and were eliminated.

=== Episode 5 ===
Original airdate:
RTL+: 9 November 2020
VOX: 23 November 2020

Event	Description
Group date	Andrea, Gino, Jakob, Jan and Michael
Single date	Jakob
Black tie ceremony	Adrian, David and Roman had to give their tie back and were eliminated.

=== Episode 6 ===
Original airdate:
RTL+: 16 November 2020
VOX: 30 November 2020

Event	Description
Single date	Gino
A night together with the Prince	Joachim
Quit	Jan and Joachim quit the competition.

=== Episode 7 ===
Original airdate:
RTL+: 23 November 2020
VOX: 7 December 2020

Event	Description
Group date	Arne, Gino, Jakob, Lauritz and Vincent
Single date	Vincent
Black tie ceremony	Andrea, Arne and Michael had to give their tie back and were eliminated.

=== Episode 8 ===
Original airdate:
RTL+: 30 November 2020
VOX: 14 December 2020

Event	Description
Single date	Lauritz
Black tie ceremony	Gino and Jakob had to give their tie back and were eliminated.

=== Episode 9 ===
Original airdate:
RTL+: 7 December 2020
VOX: 21 December 2020

Event	Description
24-hours with the Prince #1	Lauritz
24-hours with the Prince #2	Vincent
Black tie ceremony	Lauritz is the winner

=== Episode 10 - The Big Reunion ===
Original airdate:
RTL+: 14 December 2020
VOX: 21 December 2020

In The Big Reunion (German: Das große Wiedersehen) around three months after the shooting in Crete, this year's Prince Charming, Alexander Schäfer, and some of the single men who courted him meet again for the first time and review what has happened since the last episode. In addition to Prince Alexander, guests in the studio are the winner Lauritz, the runner-up Vincent and the candidates Gino, Andrea, David, Michael, Jan and Joachim. The host was Lola Weippert.

== Spin-off shows ==
=== Podcast ===
Episode	Date	Studio guest	Booting out of the week
1	12 October 2020	Hollywood Tramp	Erik
2	19 October 2020	Ricarda Hofman	Patrick
3	26 October 2020	Aaron Königs	Bastian
4	2 November 2020	Brix Schaumburg	Sascha
5	9 November 2020	Nicolas Puschmann	Adrian
6	16 November 2020	Jo Weil	—N/a
7	23 November 2020	Jochen Schropp	Andrea
8	30 November 2020	Barbie Breakout	—N/a
9	7 December 2020	Alexander Schäfer	—N/a
10	14 December 2020	Lauritz Hofmann	—N/a
