= Fritz Warnecke =

Friedrich "Fritz" Warnecke
- Born: 25 November 1898; Burgdorf, Hanover, German Empire
- Died: 4 May 1968 (aged 69); Ronnenberg, West Germany
- Military career
- Allegiance: German Empire; Weimar Republic; Nazi Germany
- Branch: Army
- Service years: 1916–1921; 1936–1945
- Rank: Generalmajor
- Commands: 62nd Volksgrenadier Division; 256. Volksgrenadier-Division
- Conflicts: World War II
- Awards: Knight's Cross of the Iron Cross

Friedrich "Fritz" Warnecke (25 November 1898 – 4 May 1968) was a German general (Generalmajor) in the Wehrmacht during World War II. He was a recipient of the Knight's Cross of the Iron Cross of Nazi Germany.

== Awards and decorations ==
- Knight's Cross of the Iron Cross on 22 January 1943 as Major and commander of the III./Grenadier-Regiment 517

Military offices
Preceded by Generalmajor Gerhard Franz	Commander of 256. Volksgrenadier-Division; April 945 – May 1945	Succeeded by None
