= Martin Bieber =

German general in the Wehrmacht

- Born: 10 November 1900; Tabarz, German Empire
- Died: 19 October 1974 (aged 73); Düsseldorf, West Germany
- Military career
- Allegiance: Nazi Germany
- Branch: Army (Wehrmacht)
- Rank: Generalmajor
- Commands: 62. Volksgrenadier-Division; 271. Volksgrenadier-Division
- Conflicts: World War II
- Awards: Knight's Cross of the Iron Cross with Oak Leaves

Martin Bieber (10 November 1900 – 19 October 1974) was a German general in the Wehrmacht of Nazi Germany during World War II who commanded several divisions. Born in Tabarz, he was a recipient of the Knight's Cross of the Iron Cross with Oak Leaves, Bieber surrendered to the Soviet forces in May 1945 and was held in the Soviet Union as a war criminal until October 1955. He died in Düsseldorf in 1974.

== Awards and decorations ==
- Iron Cross (1914) 2nd Class (4 November 1917) & 1st Class (22 September 1918)
- Honour Cross of the World War 1914/1918 (23 January 1935)
- Wehrmacht Long Service Award 4th Class (2 October 1936)
- West Wall Medal (20 April 1940)
- Clasp to the Iron Cross (1939) 2nd Class (10 June 1940) & 1st Class (24 June 1940)
- Wound Badge (1939) in Silver (15 February 1942)
- Eastern Front Medal (18 August 1942)
- German Cross in Gold on 2 January 1942 as Major in II./Infanterie-Regiment 167
- Knight's Cross of the Iron Cross with Oak Leaves
  - Knight's Cross on 28 July 1943 as Oberst and commander of Grenadier-Regiment 184
  - Oak Leaves on 2 September 1944 as Oberst and commander of Divisionsgruppe 86

Military offices
| Preceded by None | Commander of 271. Volksgrenadier-Division; 3 September 1944 – 8 May 1945 | Succeeded by None |
