= Angela Finger-Erben =

German TV presenter and journalist

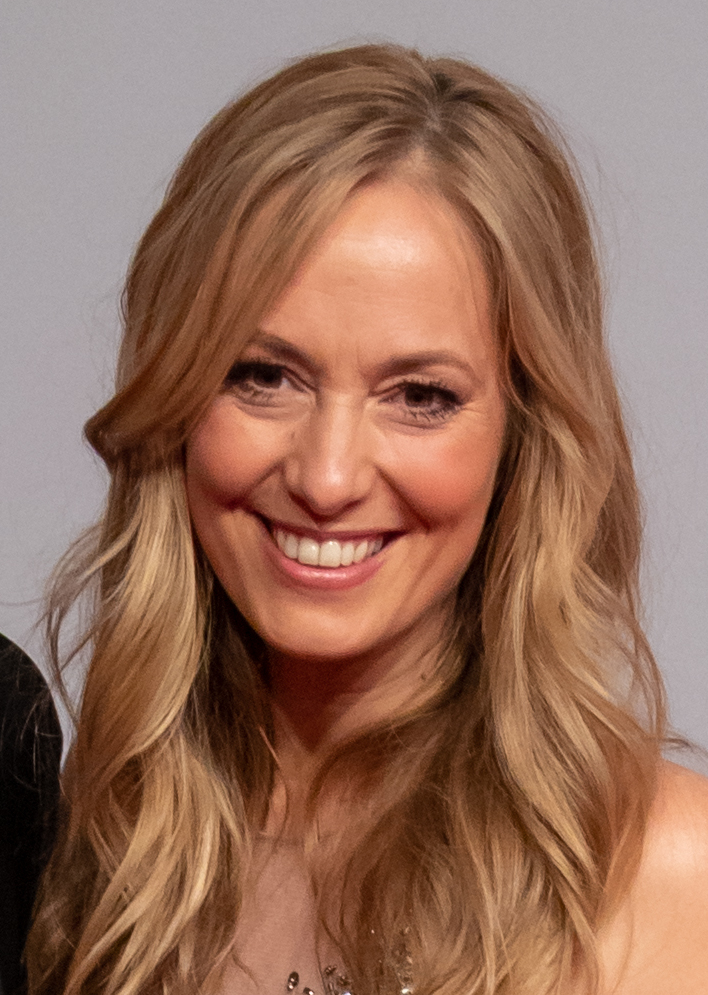
- Finger-Erben in 2019
- Born: 2 February 1980 (age 46); Nuremberg, West Germany
- Education: Hochschule Mittweida
- Occupations: TV presenter and journalist
- Employer: RTL Television
- Spouse: Jens Diestelkamp (married 2016–present)

Angela Ute Finger-Erben (born 2 February 1980) is a German TV presenter and journalist for RTL Television.

Finger-Erben was born, grew up and went to school in Nuremberg where she received vocational training in advertising before later studying media management at the Hochschule Mittweida. As part of her study abroad programme, she worked on the set of Lost as a director's assistant. Since 2006 she has been working for RTL Television.

Until 2012 Finger-Erben's partner was the comedian Simon Gosejohann. In June 2016, she married sports journalist Jens Diestelkamp, and a month later their first daughter was born, in August 2019, their second daughter was born.
