= 62nd Volksgrenadier Division =

- Active: 1944-1945
- Disbanded: 1945
- Country: Nazi Germany
- Branch: Army
- Type: Infantry
- Size: Division

Commanders
- Notable commanders: Friedrich Kittel

The 62nd Volksgrenadier Division was a volksgrenadier division of the German Army during the Second World War, active from 1944 to 1945.

The division was formed in November 1944, by redesignating the 583rd Volksgrenadier Division, under the command of Friedrich Kittel. It contained the 164th, 183rd and 190th Grenadier Regiments, and the 162nd Artillery Regiment.

The division fought in France and the Ardennes before being trapped in the Ruhr pocket, where it was destroyed in April 1945.

== Commanding officers ==
- Generalmajor Martin Bieber, 3 September 1944 – 15 September 1944
- Generalmajor Friedrich Kittel, 1 Oct 1944 – 27 January 1945
- Oberst Fritz Warnecke, ? – 10 December 1944
- Oberst Martin, 28 Jan 1945 – 11 February 1945 (acting leader)
- Oberst Heilmann, 12 February 1945 – 8 March 1945 (acting leader)
- Oberst Arthur Jüttner, 8 March 1945 – 17 April 1945 (acting leader)
