= Friedrich Kittel =

WW2 German Army general (1896-1973)

Dipl.-Ing. Friedrich Kittel
- Born: 19 December 1896; Gerolzhofen, German Empire
- Died: 24 March 1973 (aged 76); Ansbach, West Germany
- Military career
- Allegiance: German Empire (to 1918); Weimar Republic (to 1933); Nazi Germany
- Branch: Army
- Service years: 1915–1945
- Rank: Generalleutnant
- Commands: 62. Volksgrenadier-Division
- Conflicts: World War I World War II: Operation Barbarossa; Defense of Brest Fortress; Battle of Smolensk; Yelnya Offensive; Battle of Moscow; Battle of the Bulge
- Awards: Knight's Cross of the Iron Cross

Dipl.-Ing. Friedrich Kittel (Note: In German an engineer's degree is called Diplom-Ingenieur (abbreviated Dipl.-Ing.)) (19 December 1896 – 24 March 1973) was a highly decorated Generalleutnant in the Wehrmacht during World War II. He was also a recipient of the Knight's Cross of the Iron Cross. Friedrich Kittel was captured by American troops in May 1945 and was released in 1947.

== Awards and decorations ==
- Iron Cross (1914)
  - 2nd Class
  - 1st Class
- Wound Badge (1914)
  - in Black
- Honour Cross of the World War 1914/1918
- Iron Cross (1939)
  - 2nd Class
  - 1st Class
- German Cross in Gold (1 April 1942)
- Knight's Cross of the Iron Cross on 9 January 1945 as Generalmajor and commander of 62. Volksgrenadier-Division
