= Princess Charming (German TV series) =

German reality dating show

- Genre: Dating game show
- Presented by: The Big Reunion: Lola Weippert (season 1-2); Amiaz Habtu (season 3); Charlotte Würdig (season 5)
- Starring: Princess Charming: Irina Schlauch (1); Hanna Sökeland (2); Madleen Matthias (3); Lea Hoppenworth (4); Vanessa Borck (5)
- Narrated by: Nagmeh Alaei (Seasons 1-2); Moretta McLean (Season 3)
- Opening theme: "Good as Hell" - Lizzo (Seasons 1-2); "Summer Love" - Mogli (Season 3- present)
- Country of origin: Germany
- Original language: German
- No. of seasons: 5
- No. of episodes: 51

Production
- Running time: 75-80 Minutes
- Production companies: Seapoint Productions GmbH & Co. KG

Original release
- Network: RTL+
- Release: 25 May 2021 – present
- Network: VOX
- Release: 29 October 2021 – 28 June 2022
- Network: VOXup
- Release: 10 July – 13 September 2024

Princess Charming is a German reality dating show that premiered on May 25, 2021, streaming on premium sector of RTL+ and began airing on October 29, 2021, on television on VOX. It is streaming on RTL+, operated by the RTL media group, in German. The show features women-identifying and non-binary contestants and is modeled after Prince Charming (started in 2019). Princess Charming was hailed as an example of German TV shows becoming more inclusive by Deutsche Welle.

On June 22, 2021, RTL+ officially renewed the series for a second season which premiered on June 14, 2022.

On March 20, 2023, RTL+ renewed the series for a third season which premiered on September 1, 2023. VOX did not include it in its schedule. The channel had previously stopped the airing of the second season earlier than intended due to low ratings.

On December 11, 2023, RTL+ renewed the series for a fourth season which premiered on July 3, 2024. It was also broadcast on free-to-air television by VOXup, a sister station of VOX.

On March 21, 2025, RTL+ announced a fifth season which premiered about two months later on July 24 of the same year.

== Format ==
The original concept of Princess Charming, opening casting calls in October 2020, was to have a bisexual female lead, while the contestants were supposed to be lesbian or bisexual women and heterosexual men. However, the channel, in response to audience and applicant requests, changed the show concept to focus on a lesbian lead in December of the same year.

Unlike The Bachelor's "rose ceremony" or Prince Charming's black tie ceremony, contestants are eliminated if they are asked by the Princess Charming to take off and return the necklace they had previously been given.

== Seasons ==
Season	Original run			Princess	Winner	Runner-up	Still together	Relationship notes
Season	RTL+	VOX	VOXup	Princess	Winner	Runner-up	Still together	Relationship notes
1	May 25, 2021 – July 27, 2021	October 29, 2021 – December 3, 2021	N/A	Irina Schlauch	Lou	Elsa	No	After the end of filming Irina and Lou didn't start a relationship.
2	June 14, 2022 – August 16, 2022	June 21, 2022 – June 28, 2022 (Note: VOX stopped airing the season after the first two episodes due to low ratings.)	N/A	Hanna Sökeland	Jessica	Laura	No	Hanna and Jessica started a relationship after the end of filming, but announced their breakup in April 2025.
3	September 1, 2023 – November 3, 2023	N/A	N/A	Madleen Matthias	Elsa	Nina	No	After the end of filming Madleen and Elsa didn't start a relationship.
4	July 3, 2024 – September 4, 2024	N/A	July 10, 2024 – September 11, 2024	Lea Hoppenworth	N/A	Christine, Maike	N/A	Lea declined to get involved with either finalist.
5	July 24, 2025 – October 2, 2025	N/A	N/A	Vanessa Borck	N/A	N/A	N/A	Vanessa aborted the season before the finale.

== Season 1 ==
The first season premiered May 25, 2021 on RTL+ and October 29, 2021, on VOX. 30-year-old Irina Schlauch, a lawyer from Cologne, was the first Princess Charming. She said in an interview to be a fan of Prince Charming and wanting to "create more visibility and acceptance" for lesbian women through the show's format. In the same interview, she mentioned enjoying sports, including soccer, and having a twin sister. The season, which was filmed on the Greek island of Crete, consisted of nine episodes and one reunion special.

At the Reunion, Irina and Lou announced they did not start a relationship after the finale.

=== Contestants ===
Name	Age	Hometown	Outcome	Place
Lou	21	Saarbrücken	Winner	1
Elsa	22	Berlin	Runner-up	2
Bine	33	Berlin	Week 8	3-4
Miri	28	Kiel	Week 8	3-4
Gea	28	Berlin	Week 7	5-6
Kati	29	Berlin	Week 7	5-6
Iry	27	Cologne	Week 6	7-8
Sarina	27	Stolberg	Week 6	7-8
Wiki	27	Hamburg	Week 6	9 (quit)
Jana	26	Dorsten	Week 5	10-11
Johanna	26	Hildesheim	Week 5	10-11
Saskia	25	Berlin	Week 5	12 (quit)
Britta	26	Aachen	Week 4	13 (disqualified) (Note: Britta was disqualified after fracturing her elbow during a Group date.)
Anja	30	Leipzig	Week 3	14-16
Niki	27	Berlin	Week 3	14-16
Tabi	25	Dortmund	Week 3	14-16
Lia	30	Berlin	Week 2	17-18
Sandra	31	Ratingen	Week 2	17-18
Sonja	30	Salzburg	Week 1	19-20 (disqualified) (Note: Sonja and Ulle were disqualified after an (unaired) altercation.)
Ulle	28	Berlin	Week 1	19-20 (disqualified)

=== Contestant Progress ===
Contestants	Episode/Week									
Contestants	1	2	3	4	5	6	7	8	9	Reunion
Lou	IN	IN	IN	IN	IN	IN	IN	IN	WINNER	Guest
Elsa	IN	IN	IN	IN	IN	IN	IN	IN	ELIM	Guest
Bine	IN	IN	IN	IN	IN	IN	IN	ELIM		Guest
Miri	IN	IN	IN	IN	IN	IN	IN	ELIM		Guest
Gea	IN	IN	IN	IN	IN	IN	ELIM			Guest
Kati	IN	IN	IN	IN	IN	IN	ELIM			Guest
Iry	IN	IN	IN	IN	IN	ELIM				
Sarina	IN	IN	IN	IN	IN	ELIM				
Wiki	IN	IN	IN	IN	IN	QUIT				
Jana	IN	IN	IN	IN	ELIM					
Johanna	IN	IN	IN	IN	ELIM					
Saskia	IN	IN	IN	IN	QUIT					
Britta	IN	IN	IN	DISQ						Guest
Anja	IN	IN	ELIM							
Niki	IN	IN	ELIM							
Tabi	IN	IN	ELIM							
Lia	IN	ELIM								
Sandra	IN	ELIM								
Sonja	DISQ									
Ulle	DISQ									

The contestant went on a Group date with the Princess.
The contestant went on both a Group date and a Single date with the Princess.
The contestant went on a Single date with the Princess
The contestant went on a Group date and stayed a night together with the Princess.
The contestant went on a Double date with the Princess and another contestant.
The contestant quit the competition.
The contestant was disqualified.
The contestant had to give up her necklace and was eliminated.
The contestant was the runner up.
The contestant won Princess Charming.

== Season 2 ==
The Princess Charming of the second season, 28-year-old project leader Hanna Sökeland from Hanover, was introduced on April 21, 2022. The second season began airing June 14, 2022 on RTL+. VOX initially broadcast the season, releasing each episode one week after its debut on RTL+. However, the channel stopped airing it after the first two episodes due to low ratings. This also meant that the season could only be watched by RTL+ subscribers, since the "catch-up offer" (meaning the episodes were available for free on the RTL+ website for a few days after airing on VOX) expired.

At the Reunion, Hanna and Jessica announced they were still together. In April 2025, Sökeland confirmed media reports about their alleged breakup.

=== Contestants ===
Name	Age	Hometown	Outcome	Place
Jessica	26	Munich	Winner	1
Laura	22	Munich	Runner-up	2
Carolin	29	Leipzig	Week 8	3-4
Jasmin Amelia	28	Osnabrück	Week 8	3-4
Maria	30	Cologne	Week 7	5
Tyshea	30	Cologne	Week 7	6 (quit)
Sabcho	28	Berlin	Week 6	7
Dora	23	Cologne	Week 6	8-9 (quit) (Note: Dora and Paula quit the show together due to developing feelings for each other.)
Paula	28	Bremen	Week 6	8-9 (quit)
Jördis	34	Berlin	Week 5	10
Sarah	28	Düsseldorf	Week 5	11 (quit)
Charlotte	29	Bremen	Week 4	12-13
Lena	20	Leverkusen	Week 4	12-13
Katharina	30	Cologne	Week 4	14 (quit)
Anastasia	26	Kempten	Week 3	15 (quit)
Aylin	30	Berlin	Week 2	16-17
Kim	25	Hanover	Week 2	16-17
Jay	27	Frankfurt	Week 2	18 (quit)
Vivien	25	Velbert	Week 1	19

=== Contestant Progress ===
Contestants	Episode/Week									
Contestants	1	2	3	4	5	6	7	8	9	Reunion
Jessica	IN	IN	IN	IN	IN	IN	IN	IN	WINNER	Guest
Laura	IN	IN	IN	IN	IN	IN	IN	IN	ELIM	Guest
Carolin	IN	IN	IN	IN	IN	IN	IN	ELIM		Guest
Jasmin Amelia	IN	IN	IN	IN	IN	IN	IN	ELIM		
Maria	IN	IN	IN	IN	IN	IN	ELIM			Guest
Tyshea	IN	IN	IN	IN	IN	IN	QUIT			
Sabcho	IN	IN	IN	IN	IN	ELIM				
Dora	IN	IN	IN	IN	IN	QUIT				Guest
Paula	IN	IN	IN	IN	IN	QUIT				Guest
Jördis	IN	IN	IN	IN	ELIM					
Sarah	IN	IN	IN	IN	QUIT					
Charlotte	IN	IN	IN	ELIM						
Lena	IN	IN	IN	ELIM						
Katharina	IN	IN	IN	QUIT						
Anastasia	IN	IN	QUIT							
Aylin	IN	ELIM								
Kim	IN	ELIM								
Jay	IN	QUIT								
Vivien	ELIM									

The contestant went on a Group date with the Princess.
The contestant went on both a Group date and a Single date with the Princess.
The contestant went on a Single date with the Princess
The contestant went on both a Group date and stayed a night together with the Princess.
The contestant went on a Single date and stayed a night together with the Princess.
The contestant quit the competition.
The contestant had to give up her necklace and was eliminated.
The contestant was the runner up.
The contestant won Princess Charming.

== Season 3 ==
The Princess Charming of the third season, 23-year-old college student Madleen Matthias from Weyhe, was introduced on August 16, 2022. The season began airing September 1, 2023 on RTL+. Three contestants were absent from the first episode and joined the competition later on. One of them, Stephie Stark, had previously been a contestant on the German version of The Bachelor and publicly came out as pansexual before joining Princess Charming. The season additionally featured Elsa, a returning contestant from Season 1. Unlike the previous two seasons, this one was mainly shot on the Thai island of Ko Samui, with the finale taking place in Bangkok.

At the Reunion, Madleen and Elsa announced they did not start a relationship after the finale.

=== Contestants ===
Name	Age	Hometown	Outcome	Place
Elsa	24	Berlin	Winner	1
Nina	31	Berlin	Runner-up	2
Aleyna	23	Cologne	Week 8	3-4
Natalie	31	Mönchengladbach	Week 8	3-4
Jazz	28	Hamburg	Week 7	5-6
Melanie	29	Berlin	Week 7	5-6
Aysun	23	Mannheim	Week 6	7-9
Gabi	29	Berlin	Week 6	7-9
Lili	29	Cologne	Week 6	7-9
Linh	26	Salzburg	Week 5	10-11
Stephie	28	Cologne	Week 5	10-11
Kim	32	Cologne	Week 4	12
Maria	29	Frankfurt	Week 4	13-14 (quit) (Note: Maria and Rahel quit the show together due to developing feelings for each other.)
Rahel	27	Berlin	Week 4	13-14 (quit)
Desi	25	Cologne	Week 3	15 (quit)
Ailena	26	Regensburg	Week 3	16-17
Meli	27	Zürich	Week 3	16-17
Ebru	33	Buchholz in der Nordheide	Week 2	18-20
Lucy	25	Innsbruck	Week 2	18-20
Nora	25	Cologne	Week 2	18-20

=== Contestant Progress ===
Contestants	Episode/Week									
Contestants	1	2	3	4	5	6	7	8	9	Reunion
Elsa				IN	IN	IN	IN	IN	WINNER	Guest
Nina	IN	IN	IN	IN	IN	IN	IN	IN	ELIM	Guest
Aleyna	IN	IN	IN	IN	IN	IN	IN	ELIM		Guest
Natalie	IN	IN	IN	IN	IN	IN	IN	ELIM		Guest
Jazz	IN	IN	IN	IN	IN	IN	ELIM			
Melanie	IN	IN	IN	IN	IN	IN	ELIM			Guest
Aysun	IN	IN	IN	IN	IN	ELIM				
Gabi	IN	IN	IN	IN	IN	ELIM				
Lili	IN	IN	IN	IN	IN	ELIM				Guest
Linh	IN	IN	IN	IN	ELIM					
Stephie		IN	IN	IN	ELIM					
Kim	IN	IN	IN	ELIM						
Maria	IN	IN	IN	QUIT						
Rahel	IN	IN	IN	QUIT						
Desi	IN	IN	QUIT							Guest
Aileena	IN	IN	ELIM							
Meli		IN	ELIM							
Ebru	IN	ELIM								
Lucy	IN	ELIM								
Nora	IN	ELIM								

The contestant went on a Group date with the Princess.
The contestant went on both a Group date and a Single date with the Princess.
The contestant went on a Single date with the Princess
The contestant went on a Single date and stayed a night together with the Princess.
The contestant quit the competition.
The contestant had to give up her necklace and was eliminated.
The contestant was the runner up.
The contestant won Princess Charming.

== Season 4 ==
The Princess Charming of the fourth season, 30-year-old copywriter Lea Hoppenworth from Berlin, was introduced on June 11, 2024. The season began airing on July 3 of the same year. Maike, one of the featured contestants, had previously been in a relationship with Hoppenworth. The main shooting location remained Ko Samui while the finale was filmed in Phuket instead of Bangkok.

In the finale, Hoppenworth decided to eliminate both remaining contestants. She was therefore the first Princess Charming to not pick a winner.

=== Contestants ===
Name	Age	Hometown	Outcome	Place
Christine	28	Cologne	Runner-up	2
Maike	30	Berlin	Runner-up	2
Marlen	31	Cologne	Week 9	3-4
Sarah	29	Berlin	Week 9	3-4
Katharina	28	Regensburg	Week 8	5-8
Marjam	30	Hamburg	Week 8	5-8
Hang	31	Hanover	Week 8	5-8
Laura	28	Bochum	Week 8	5-8
Lara	27	Frankfurt	Week 7	9-10
Tommi	23	Osnabrück	Week 7	9-10
Inci	27	Heidelberg	Week 7	11 (quit)
Lucia	28	Leipzig	Week 5	12-14
Sara	20	Vienna	Week 5	12-14
Seleya	23	Cologne	Week 5	12-14
Melissa	28	Neuss	Week 5	15 (quit)
Sina	24	Munich	Week 5	16-17
Tay	25	Zurich	Week 5	16-17
Julia	23	Berlin	Week 2	18-20
Lisa	24	Bamberg	Week 2	18-20
Viviana	24	Vienna	Week 2	18-20

=== Contestant Progress ===
Contestants	Episode/Week									
Contestants	1	2	3	4	5	6	7	8	9	10
Christine	IN	IN	IN	IN	IN	IN	IN	IN	IN	ELIM
Maike	IN	IN	IN	IN	IN	IN	IN	IN	IN	ELIM
Marlen	IN	IN	IN	IN	IN	IN	IN	IN	ELIM	
Sarah	IN	IN	IN	IN	IN	IN	IN	IN	ELIM	
Katharina	IN	IN	IN	IN	IN	IN	IN	ELIM		
Marjam	IN	IN	IN	IN	IN	IN	IN	ELIM		
Hang	IN	IN	IN	IN	IN	IN	IN	ELIM		
Laura	IN	IN	IN	IN	IN	IN	IN	ELIM		
Inci	IN	IN	IN	IN	IN	IN	QUIT			
Lara	IN	IN	IN	IN	IN	IN	ELIM			
Tommi	IN	IN	IN	IN	IN	IN	ELIM			
Melissa	IN	IN	IN	IN	QUIT					
Lucia	IN	IN	IN	IN	ELIM					
Sara	IN	IN	IN	IN	ELIM					
Seleya	IN	IN	IN	IN	ELIM					
Sina	IN	IN	IN	IN	ELIM					
Tay	IN	IN	IN	IN	ELIM					
Julia	IN	ELIM								
Lisa	IN	ELIM								
Viviana	IN	ELIM								

The contestant went on a Group date with the Princess.
The contestant went on both a Group date and a Single date with the Princess.
The contestant went on a Single date with the Princess.
The contestant went on a Double date and stayed a night together with the Princess.
The contestant went on a Double date with the Princess and another contestant.
The contestant quit the competition.
The contestant had to give up her necklace and was eliminated.
The contestant was the runner up.

== Season 5 ==
The Princess Charming of the fifth season, 28-year-old influencer Vanessa Borck from Berlin, was introduced on March 21, 2025. The season was again shot in Thailand (with the location not further disclosed by RTL) and began airing on July 24 that year.

In the tenth episode, Borck announced to the remaining contestants that she decided to abort the season due to Lotti, a contestant she had developed feelings for, quitting shortly beforehand. Because of this, Borck was the first Princess Charming to prematurely end the competition and the second to not pick a winner.

=== Contestants ===
Name	Age	Hometown	Outcome	Place
Anna	29	Iserlohn	Week 10	4-8
Kim	28	Aachen	Week 10	4-8
Marlene	27	Cologne	Week 10	4-8
Seinep	29	Oldenburg	Week 10	4-8
Shirine	33	Hanau	Week 10	4-8
Lotti	27	Berlin	Week 10	9 (quit)
Fiona	24	Cologne	Week 9	10
Donija	31	Bielefeld	Week 9	11 (quit)
Jeni	26	Essen	Week 9	11 (quit)
Bianca	36	Berlin	Week 8	12-13
Lara	23	Magdeburg	Week 8	12-13
Vanessa	26	Dresden	Week 8	14 (quit)
Alia	26	Viersen	Week 5	15 (quit) (Note: Alia and Chantal-Jale quit the show together due to developing feelings for each other.)
Caro	26	Cologne	Week 5	15 (quit)
Chantal-Jale	24	Wuppertal	Week 5	15 (quit)
Johanna	26	Freiburg im Breisgau	Week 2	16-17
Julia	27	Hamburg	Week 2	16-17
Kelly	31	Kassel	Week 1	18

=== Contestant Progress ===
Contestants	Episode/Week										
Contestants	1	2	3	4	5	6	7	8	9	10	Reunion
Anna	IN	IN	IN	IN	IN	IN	IN	IN	IN	ABORT	Guest
Kim	IN	IN	IN	IN	IN	IN	IN	IN	IN	ABORT	Guest
Marlene	IN	IN	IN	IN	IN	IN	IN	IN	IN	ABORT	
Seinep	IN	IN	IN	IN	IN	IN	IN	IN	IN	ABORT	Guest
Shirine	IN	IN	IN	IN	IN	IN	IN	IN	IN	ABORT	
Lotti	IN	IN	IN	IN	IN	IN	IN	IN	IN	QUIT	Guest
Fiona	IN	IN	IN	IN	IN	IN	IN	IN	ELIM		Guest
Donija	IN	IN	IN	IN	IN	IN	IN	IN	QUIT		Guest
Jeni	IN	IN	IN	IN	IN	IN	IN	IN	QUIT		
Bianca	IN	IN	IN	IN	IN	IN	IN	ELIM			
Lara	IN	IN	IN	IN	IN	IN	IN	ELIM			
Vanessa	IN	IN	IN	IN	IN	IN	IN	QUIT			
Alia	IN	IN	IN	IN	QUIT						Guest
Caro	IN	IN	IN	IN	QUIT						
Chantal-Jale	IN	IN	IN	IN	QUIT						Guest
Johanna	IN	ELIM									
Julia	IN	ELIM									
Kelly	ELIM										

The contestant went on a Group date with the Princess.
The contestant went on both a Group date and a Single date with the Princess.
The contestant went on a Single date with the Princess.
The contestant went on a Double date, a Single Date and stayed a night together with the Princess.
The contestant stayed a night together with the Princess.
The contestant quit the competition.
The contestant had to give up her necklace and was eliminated.
The contestant had to give up her necklace due to the Princess aborting the season
