= St. Vith =

City in the German-speaking Community of Belgium

Sankt Vith: Saint Vith (French)
- Municipality
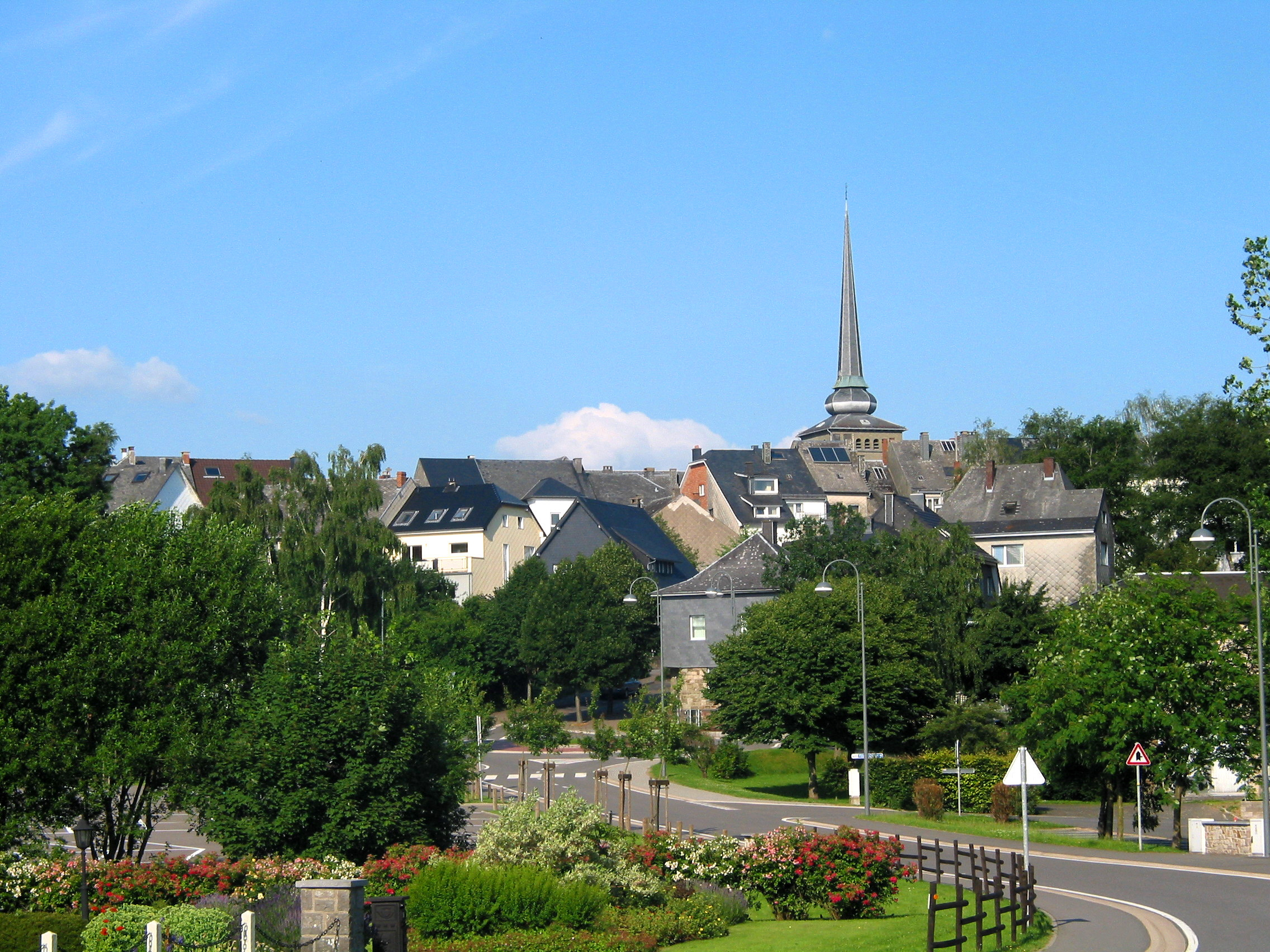
- View of St. Vith

- Flag Coat of arms

- Location of St. Vith in the province of Liège
- Interactive map of Sankt Vith
- Location in Belgium
- Coordinates: 50°16′N 06°07′E
- Country: Belgium
- Community: German-speaking Community of Belgium
- Region: Wallonia
- Province: Liège
- Arrondissement: Verviers

Government
  - Mayor: Werner Henkes
  - Governing party: Liste Gemeinsam

Area
  - Total: 147.15 km^{2} (56.81 sq mi)

Population (2018-01-01)
  - Total: 9,682
  - Density: 65.80/km^{2} (170.4/sq mi)
- Postal codes: 4780-4784
- NIS code: 63067
- Area codes: 080
- Website: www.st.vith.be

St. Vith (German: Sankt Vith [zaŋkt ˈfɪt]; French: Saint-Vith [sɛ̃ vit]; Luxembourgish: Sankt Väit [ˌzɑŋkt ˈvæːɪ̯t]; Walloon: Sint-Vit) is a city and municipality of East Belgium located in the Walloon province of Liège. It was named after Saint Vitus. The majority language is German, as in the rest of the German-speaking Community of Belgium.

On January 1, 2006, St. Vith had a total population of 9,169. The total area is 146.93 km^{2}, giving a population density of 62 inhabitants per km^{2}. The official language of the municipality is German.

The municipality consists of the following sub-municipalities: Sankt Vith, Crombach, Lommersweiler, Recht, and Schönberg.

== History ==
St. Vith was an important marketplace of the region by the 12th century and received town rights in 1350. The town was damaged by fires in 1543, 1602, and 1689. It was part of the Duchy of Luxemburg then of France until the defeat of French Emperor Napoleon Bonaparte. As a result of the Congress of Vienna it was given to the Kingdom of Prussia.

St. Vith was transferred to Belgium on March 6, 1925, by the Treaty of Versailles after the defeat of the German Empire in World War I.

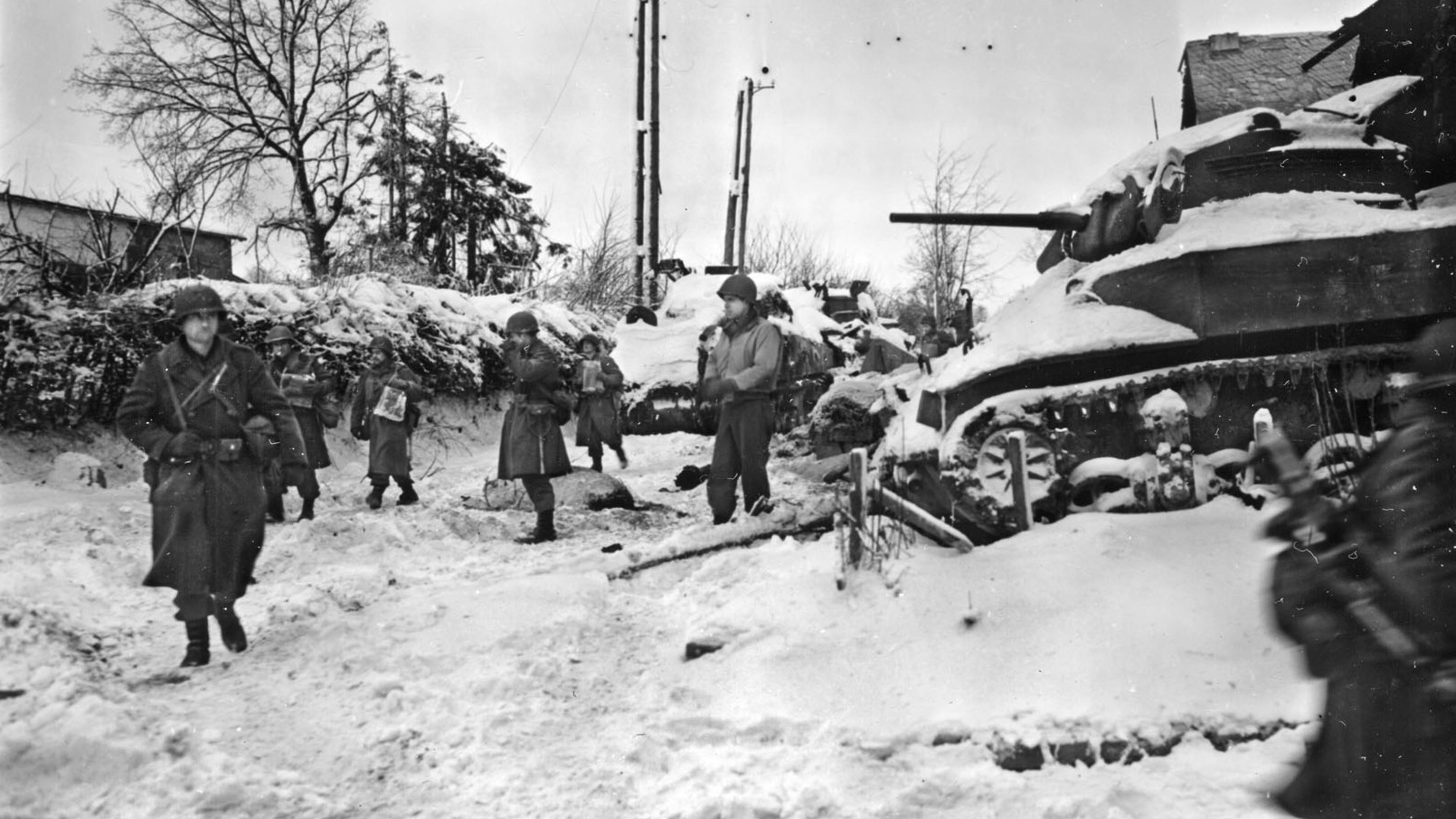
American soldiers of the 117th Infantry Regiment, Tennessee National Guard, part of the 30th Infantry Division, move past a destroyed American M5A1 "Stuart" tank on their march to recapture the town of St. Vith during the Battle of the Bulge, January 1945.

An important road and railway junction, St. Vith was fought over in the 1944 Battle of the Bulge during World War II. The United States Army defended the town against German assault for a few days, delaying the German attack plan, before eventually being forced to retreat. Once it was captured by German forces, the town was bombed by the US Army Air Forces on 25 and 26 December 1944 and by RAF Bomber Command with 300 aircraft on 26 December. St. Vith was mostly destroyed during the ground battle and subsequent air attack. American forces retook the town on January 23, 1945. The only pre-war architecture remaining is the Büchel Tower.

St. Vith is the setting for Michael Oren's novel, Reunion, concerning a fictional reunion of an American battalion which participated in the Battle of the Bulge.

== Sister cities ==
- Kerpen, North Rhine-Westphalia, Germany
- Teiuș, Alba County, Romania

== Notable people ==
- Silvio Gesell (born 1862), German-Argentine economist and social reformer who founded the "Free Economy" movement.
- Bruno Thiry (born 1962), Rally driver and 2003 ERC Champion
- Thierry Neuville (born 1988), Rally driver and 2024 WRC Champion

== See also ==
- List of protected heritage sites in Sankt-Vith
