= RTL+ =

European video on demand streaming service serving Germany and Hungary

- Website type: Streaming service
- Predecessor: RTL Most (Hungary)
- Area served: Germany; Austria; Switzerland; Hungary
- Owner: RTL Group
- Parent: RTL Deutschland; RTL Magyarország
- Website: www.rtlplus.de www.rtlplusz.hu
- Launched: 2007 (as RTLnow); 2016 (as TVNOW); 2021 (as RTL+)

RTL+ (formerly TVNOW in German-speaking countries, and RTL Most in Hungary) is a European video on demand streaming service belonging to RTL Deutschland and RTL Magyarország, in turn part of the Bertelsmann-owned RTL Group.

== History ==
Its origins trace back to the launch of the 'RTLnow.de' portal in 2007. In 2016, all the video portals corresponding to the different channels of the TV network merged into TVNOW.

On November 4, 2021, TVNOW became RTL+. At the time, TVNOW was providing a three-layered service (Free, Premium and Premium Duo), having about 2 million paid subscription users, making around 3.4 million users together with Dutch RTL branch Videoland.

On February 16, 2022, RTL Deutschland announced a cooperation with the U.S. media company Warner Bros. Discovery. In this context, series and movies from Warner as well as HBO Originals from the streaming provider HBO Max, which are available since 2026 in Germany, are to be successively integrated into the RTL+ portfolio, in some cases exclusively, starting in the first quarter of 2022.

Since 2026, RTL+ has been sold bundled with HBO Max.

On November 16, 2022, RTL+ was launched in Hungary by RTL Magyarország, replacing RTL Most, in order to expand more with Hungarian content online.

Following the redesign graphics of RTL in the Netherlands, rumors has said that the merger between RTL XL and Videoland to form RTL+, to expand Dutch content on the Internet. It will be in the Q3 2023.
