= LGBTQ tourism in Brazil =

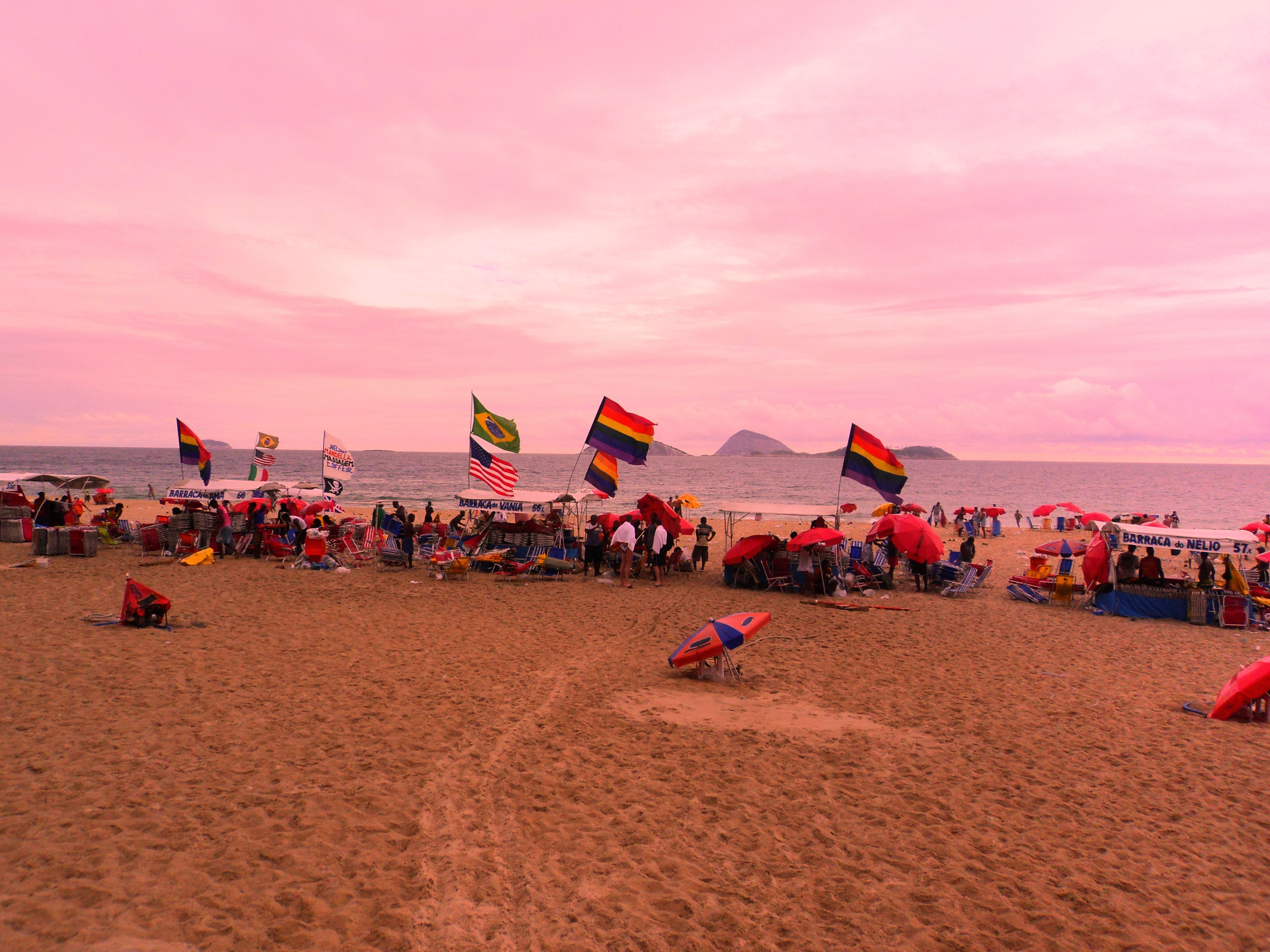
LGBTQ Ipanema, in Rio de Janeiro.

LGBTQ tourism in Brazil is a form of niche tourism marketed to gay, lesbian, bisexual and transgender (LGBTQ) people who come to Brazil. The city of Rio de Janeiro was elected the best LGBTQ destination of the world, according to the U.S. Logo channel, owned by Viacom's MTV Networks. Rio de Janeiro also was elected the most sexy city of the world to LGBTQ people, according to the U.S. Logo channel and TripOutGayTravel. In 2014, Brazil and the United States were the two countries more wanted by international LGBT tourists, according to the World Travel Market.

== Demographics ==
About 26% of visitors to São Paulo, Rio de Janeiro, Florianópolis, Salvador and Fortaleza are LGBTQ people. Brazil has more than 6,000 gay-friendly hotels and hostels registered in travel agencies and mainly specialized in the gay-oriented sites, which are the major source of information for travelers. The establishments receives a sticker with a rainbow, a global symbol of the gay movement.

== Revenue ==
During the carnival of Rio de Janeiro in 2014, 30.75% of tourism revenue was from LGBTQ people. The total was R$1.5 billion, and 461 million of gays and lesbians. The majority of tourists in Brazil were from the states of São Paulo and Minas Gerais, and from other countries were the United States, United Kingdom, and Canada.

The Brazilian LGBTQ prides move millions in cash every year. Only the São Paulo Gay Pride Parade, with 3.5 million participants, attracts 400,000 LGBTQ tourists, that will yield to the coffers of the state, about $70 million euros or $160 million reais.

According to Out Now Consulting, in 2010, LGBTQ consumers residing in Argentina have spent a total of US$4 billion in leisure travel. In Mexico, LGBTQ consumers spent US$8 billion in leisure travel, while LGBT Brazilians spend more than US$20 billion in leisure travel, the largest in Latin America. The majority of foreign LGBTQ tourists in Brazil are U.S. citizens, British, Germans, French, and Dutch. According to the LGBTQ app Grindr, the city of Rio de Janeiro has the best gay beach of the world, and the city of São Paulo has the best gay parade of the world.

== See also ==
- LGBTQ tourism
- Gay village
- LGBTQ marketing
- List of LGBTQ events
