= Mostafa Mohaghegh Damad =

Iranian Shia Ayatollah

Seyyed Mostafa Mohaghegh Damad مصطفی محقق داماد
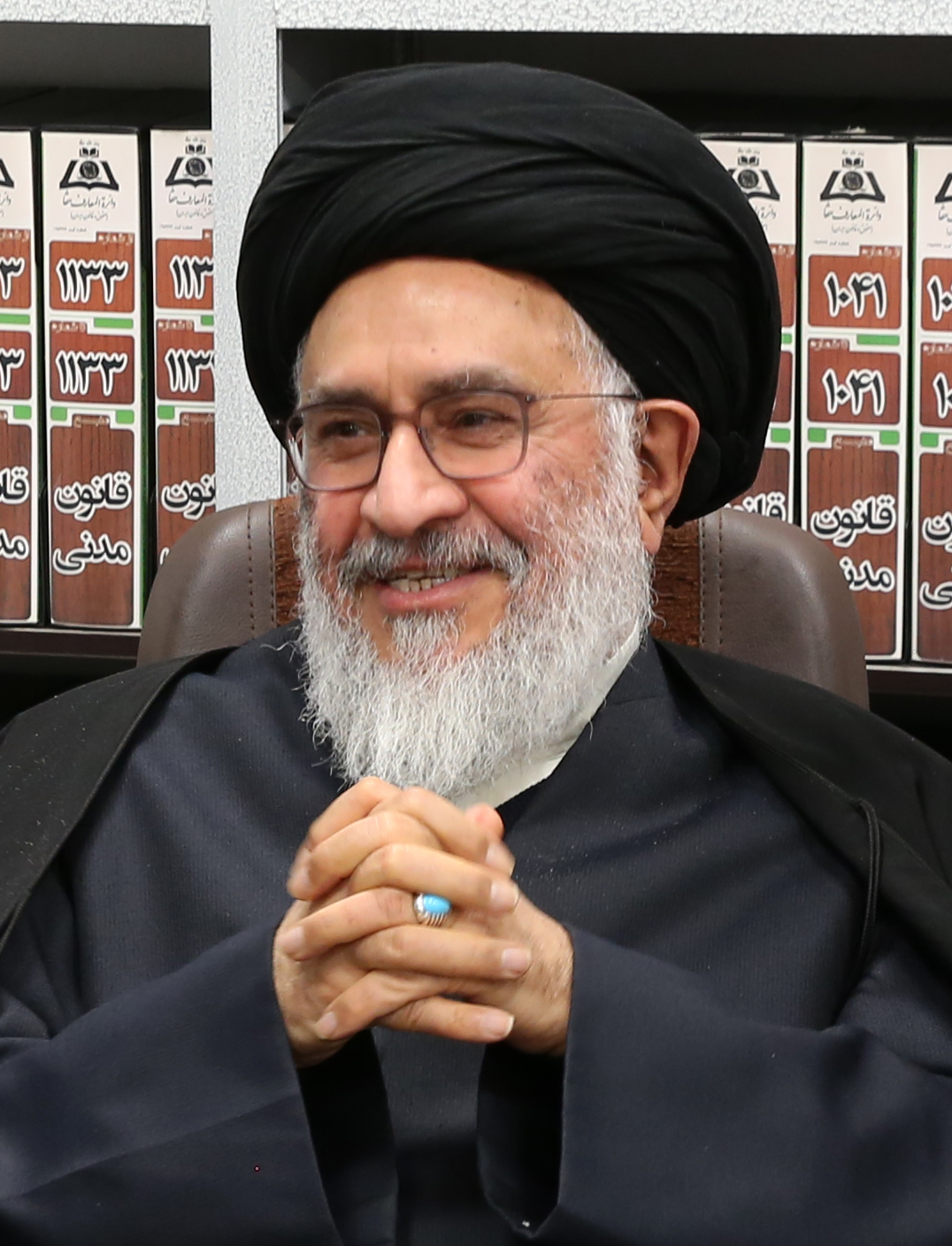
- Mohaghegh Damad in Iranian Law and Legal Research Institute
- Title: Allameh

Personal life
- Born: 1945 (age 80–81) Qom, Iran
- Spouse: Fazeleh Larijani
- Children: 5
- Other name: Persian: مصطفی محقق داماد
- Website: www.mdamad.com

Religious life
- Religion: Shia Islam (Usuli Twelver)

Mostafa Mohaghegh Damad (Persian: سید مصطفی محقق داماد; born 1945) is an Iranian Shia cleric and scholar.

== Education ==
Mostafa passed his Islamic education in Arabic literature, Quran, Hadith, Islamic philosophy, theology, and jurisprudence at the Fayzieh School in the Qom. He achieved the degree of Ijtihad in 1970. Also, he continued his modern academic education in Islamic Philosophy and graduated on 1969 from Tehran University. After that he achieved his Master of Science degree in Islamic Jurisprudence on 1980 from Tehran University. In 1996, he went to University of Louvain (UCLouvain) in Belgium and earned his Ph.D. degree.

== Responsibilities ==
As of 1988, he is member of The Academy of Sciences of Iran. Also, he is a professor in Faculty of Law at Shahid Beheshti University from 2007. He reportedly has held such posts in Iran as Chief of the State Inspectorate Organization, head of the Department of Islamic Studies of the Academy of Sciences of Iran, head of Commission of Judicial Bill Collection of Iran, and head of Commission of Compiling Judicial Acts.

At a September 2005 speech in the United States written up by an Iranian American doctor, he gave his opinions that there are no irreconcilable differences between the Universal Declaration of Human Rights and Islamic jurisprudence, that no compulsion is permissible in religion, that apostasy should be punished only if it involves undertaking actions to destabilize the social order, and that "nothing should be forced on the people by the government, not even daily prayers."

In October 2010, Damad, representing Shia Islam, delivered an address to the Special Assembly for the Middle East of the Synod of Catholic Bishops. He spoke of “the rapport between Islam and Christianity” as “based upon inspirations and propositions of the holy Quran” and as “founded upon friendship, respect and mutual understanding.” Such rapport is “certainly important for peace in the World.” Damad also expressed his gratitude to Pope Benedict XVI for the Pope's support of “rapport between Christians and Muslims.”

In September 2022, following the death of Mahsa Amini in the custody of the Guidance Patrol, Damad echoed the sentiment: “The establishment of the force for promotion of virtues and prevention of vice is in fact meant to monitor the rulers’ actions, not to crack down on the citizens’ freedoms and is a deviation from Islamic teachings.”

On 3 February 2026, Damad, in light of the 2025–2026 Iranian protests, reposted a 2017 speech where he apologized for government violence, saying: "We have failed to promote Islamic morality and educate today's generation to be kind, compassionate, and non-violent."

== See also ==
- Lists of maraji
