= LGBTQ marketing =

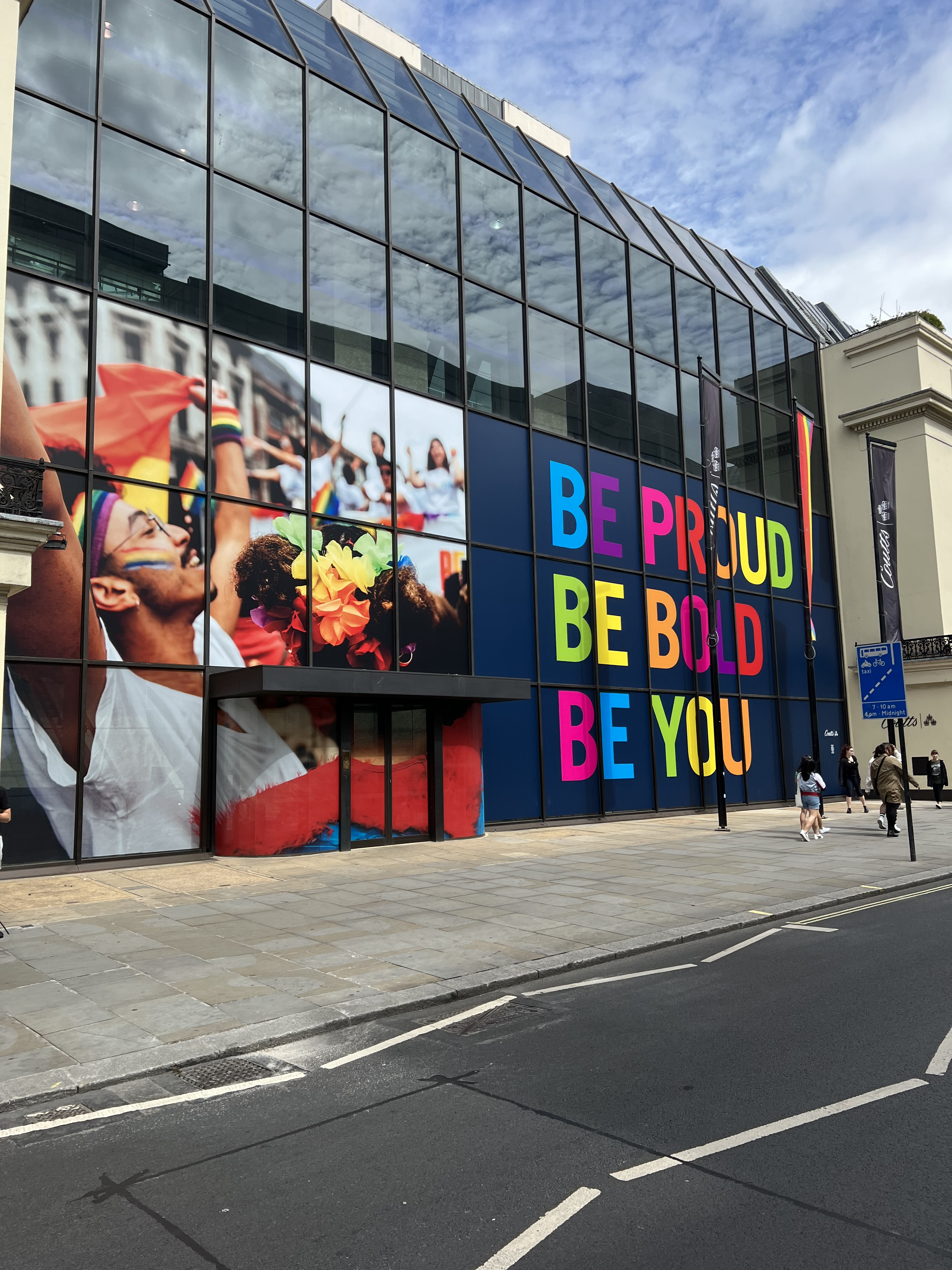
British bank Coutts broadcast their inclusivity at their Strand headquarters, 2022

LGBTQ marketing is the act of marketing to LGBTQ customers, either with dedicated ads or general ads, or through sponsorships of LGBTQ organizations and events, or the targeted use of any other element of the marketing mix.

The LGBTQ market comprises a group of customers who buy goods and services from a broad range of companies across industry segments and in many countries.

== Statistics ==
Marketing to the gay and lesbian community faces statistical obstacles in that few credible peer-reviewed estimates of the gay and lesbian marketplace have been published. In particular, the use of non-random "convenience surveys" on attendees at gay resorts and subscribers to gay or lesbian newspapers has resulted in unreliable statistical estimates of LGBTQ buying power. The exact number of gays and lesbians in a given market is generally, if not always, unknown.

However, some national governments have started to publish data that include demographics of sexual orientation from census results. In the 2000 United States census, two questions were asked that allowed same-sex partnerships to be counted, and the Census Bureau reported that there were more than 658,000 same-sex couples heading households in the United States. In 2013, the American Marketing Association reported that 3.5% of adults in the United States identified as lesbian, gay, bisexual, and .3% of adults as transgender. At that time, the LGBTQ consumer market was estimated to have an overall buying power of more than $835 billion.

== Advertising categories ==
Major ad categories include travel, financial services, alcoholic beverages, automotive, entertainment, hair and skincare, luxury goods, pharmaceuticals, and fashion. For example, American Airlines has launched a specific LGBT-targeted vacations website. While over 50 years old in the United States, LGBTQ marketing is a relatively newer marketing phenomenon elsewhere in Australia and Europe, including Belgium and the Netherlands.

Many brands that have previously ignored the existence of this segment of society now increasingly target LGBTQ customers. In August 2006, Time magazine carried a Business article on growing interest amongst brand name advertisers in Europe to target LGBTQ customers.

In 2013, the Human Rights Campaign issued the Corporate Equality Index 2013, which provides a national benchmarking tool on corporate policies and practices related to LGBTQ employees in the United States. This is also used to determine a company's level of gay-friendliness. The index includes "marketing and advertising to LGBTQ+ consumers" as part of the Corporate Social Responsibility section of its annual scoring system, and in 2025 72% of companies rated did so.

== Social media ==
Social media plays an incredibly important part in an LGBTQ youth's life, with Amy Adele Hassinoff stating that "a variety of studies of gay, lesbian, transgender and queer youth indicate that the internet provides an important way to connect with communities and romantic partners, find information, and gain confidence" (Hasinoff, 2012). For marketers, this is important knowledge to possess as it suggests that LGBTQ marketing should place a heavy focus on the social media aspects of their campaigns.

== Social marketing ==
A large amount of the marketing that is aimed at the LGBTQ community has a heavy focus on social marketing.

Social marketing is defined by Alan R. Andreasen as: "The adaption of commercial marketing technologies... to influence the voluntary behaviour of target audiences to improve their personal welfare and that of the society of which they are a part" (Andreasen, 1994).

Social marketing's main aim is to raise awareness about a topic or issue within a community and work to change the overall opinion, attitude, or actions associated with that issue. Social marketing in a community that is as intimate and intertwined as the LGBTQ community is an effective and important way to get messages across that benefit the community as a whole.

== Social benefits of successful LGBTQ marketing campaigns ==
The effects of a successful LGBTQ marketing campaign can positively impact the LGBTQ community in ways that make the community safer and more welcoming, which is the overall goal of social marketing. Some examples of these effects include:

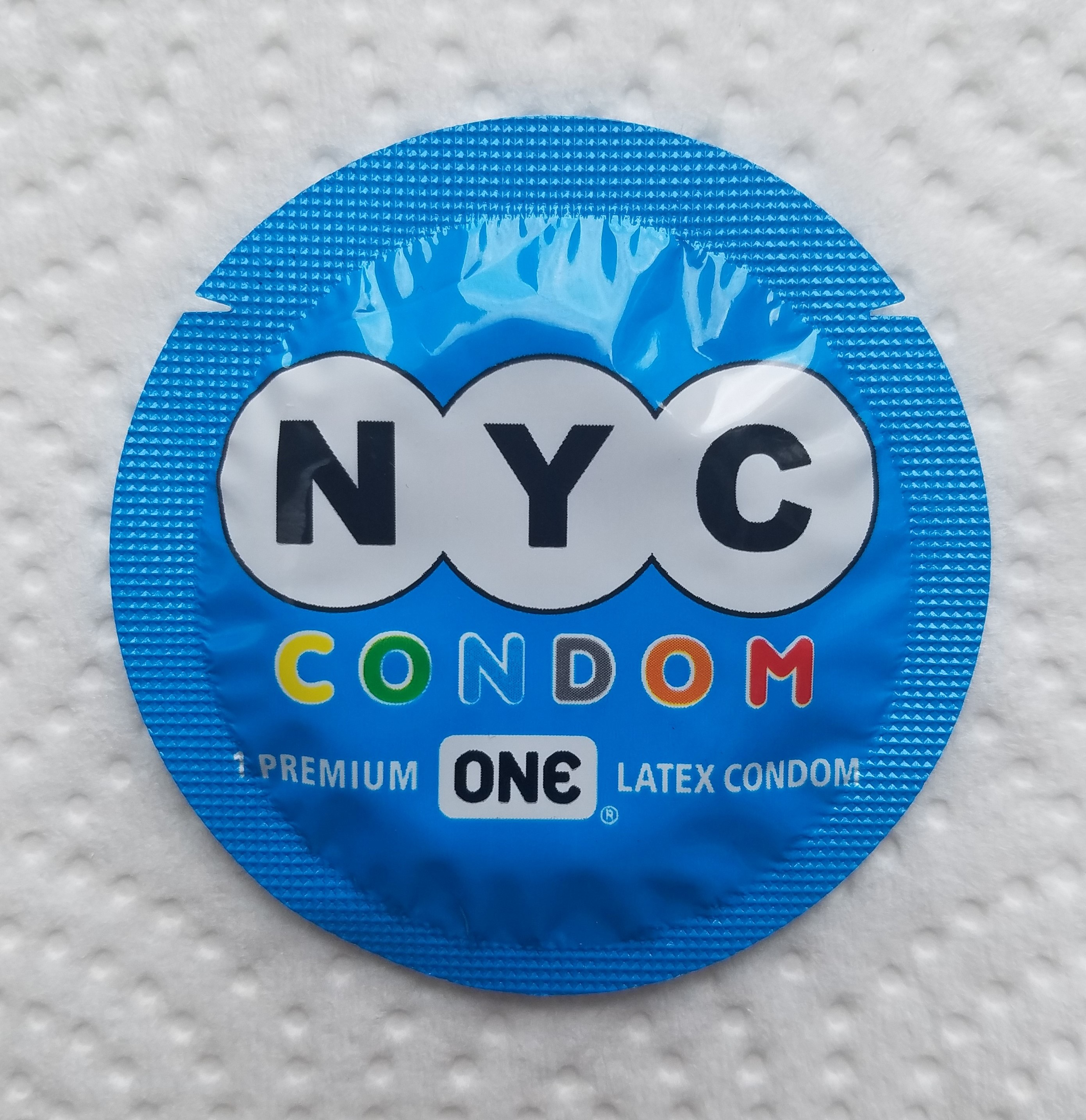
A condom given out by NYC Health Department during the Stonewall 50 – WorldPride NYC 2019 celebrations.

=== Love Your Condom – New Zealand ===
The New Zealand Aids Foundation (NZAF) launched the Love Your Condom (LYC) campaign in 2014 to promote the concept of safer sex through the active use of condoms and lube every time gay/bisexual men have sex. The overall goal of the campaign was to reduce the transmission of HIV in New Zealand amongst gay and bisexual men, as these were the groups that were identified as the highest at risk (Clayton-Brown, 2015).

The LYC campaign incorporates traditional media, such as billboards and print, (i.e. newspapers and magazines), along with an active social media presence and guerrilla marketing to engage with its target audience – gay/bisexual men in New Zealand.

The campaign was launched after the NZAF executive director Shaun Robinson noticed condom use amongst men who have sex with men, otherwise known as MSM, was on the decline, both in NZ and internationally (Saxton et al., 2015).

The success of the campaign can be measured through the popularity of the LYC social media channels as a part of the NZ LGBTQ community, and in the statistic published on the NZAF webpage that states "new HIV infection rates among MSM in NZ have dropped 12%" since the launch of LYC. (NZAF, n.d.)

=== Know Your Status Stage – New York ===
The not-for-profit organization LifeBeat is a charity that works with the music industry to educate America's young LGBTQ and their allies about the realities and dangers of HIV/AIDS (LifeBeat, c2013).

In 2014 LifeBeat launched the Know Your Status Stage (KYSS) campaign to try and raise awareness for the importance of getting tested for HIV on a larger scale than ever before. The idea behind it was to hold a large scale music event with artists that were very attractive to the target audience, (LGBTQ aged 13–25), where the only way to receive a ticket was to take a simple HIV test. The two objectives were to get at least 167 youth to visit the testing locations and attract NYC youth who had never been tested. (Effie Worldwide, 2015)

Due to the mass followings of the artists on social media and the incorporation of traditional advertising through the use of billboards in popular areas and ads in newspapers that were popular with their target audience, the campaign went viral.

A large factor of this success is that today's youth experience a new phenomenon that has been labeled 'FOMO', or fear of missing out, as a result of social media which meant more and more of the target audience were getting tested just to attend this event (Przybylski et al., 2013).

This campaign's success was unprecedented due to the heavy online social media presence of the youth, spreading this event through word of mouth. The objective of 167 youth tested was almost tripled, and 60% of those youth tested said they had never been tested before, with 98% of those saying they would get tested again. (Effie Worldwide, 2015)

As a direct result of this campaign, numbers of youth that were educated in terms of HIV and their own status in New York City grew considerably, and therefore the LGBTQ community could be perceived as a safer place, as these youth were now aware of the risks involved with sex, and the consequences of unsafe sex. LifeBeat stated that "due to the impressive performance of the KYSS idea in New York, the name was registered to spread the initiative to other cities in other states with high youth HIV indices, like Florida, California, Texas and Georgia" (Effie Worldwide, 2015).

== Controversies ==
LGBTQ marketing initiatives have not been without controversy both for and against them. Coors Brewing Company was the subject of a boycott by the LGBTQ community starting in 1973. The boycott was initiated by labor unions to protest the company's antagonistic practices, and was later joined by African Americans, Mexicans, and the LGBTQ community. The LGBTQ community joined to protest Coors' hiring practices – polygraph tests were often required, during which the prospective employee was asked about their sexual orientation.

Coors ignored the boycott for several years, but made some concessions in 1978, and in 1995 began several countermeasures, including dropping the questions regarding homosexuality and extending domestic partnership benefits to its LGBTQ employees. The company also hired Mary Cheney as a marketing representative and began advertising in The Advocate and at events such as Denver's PrideFest.

Specialist LGBTQ marketing agencies in various countries provide specialized LGBTQ market services to companies seeking to target LGBTQ customers.

The tobacco and alcohol industries have marketed products directly to the LGBT+ community. In 1990, ACT-UP, an AIDS organization, boycotted Phillip Morris. Following this, other tobacco companies began funding AIDS organizations. In a 2013 study, LGBT+ participants reported statistically significant higher levels of exposure to tobacco-related content than non-LGBT+ participants. In 2010, of the sampled parades that listed sponsors, 61% of the prides were sponsored by the alcohol industry.

In a study gauging LGBT+ response to targeted marketing, researchers noted that participants, particularly non-POC, interpreted it as valuable representation.

The LGBT+ community has historically suffered from higher levels of substance abuse than non-LGBT+ individuals. As of 2013, LGBT+ youth struggle with higher levels of alcohol usage than their non-LGBT+ peers, a pattern previously seen in 1998, 2003, and 2008 data. In a 2016 study, 49.5% of LGBT+ respondents reported current cigarette smoking, while 70.2% recognized smoking endangered one's health. In 2009-2010 data from the National Adult Tobacco Survey, gay and bisexual smokers were less likely to be aware of cessation helplines than straight smokers.

Marketing campaigns focusing on lowering levels of LGBT+ substance abuse have been attempted. Break Up, an LGBT+ focused anti-smoking campaign, was met with mixed results; while a study following its implementation indicated helpline usage had increased, cessation attempts had not. In 2016, the FDA funded the This Free Life campaign to help prevent and reduce smoking among LGBT+ young adults.

=== Pinkwashing ===
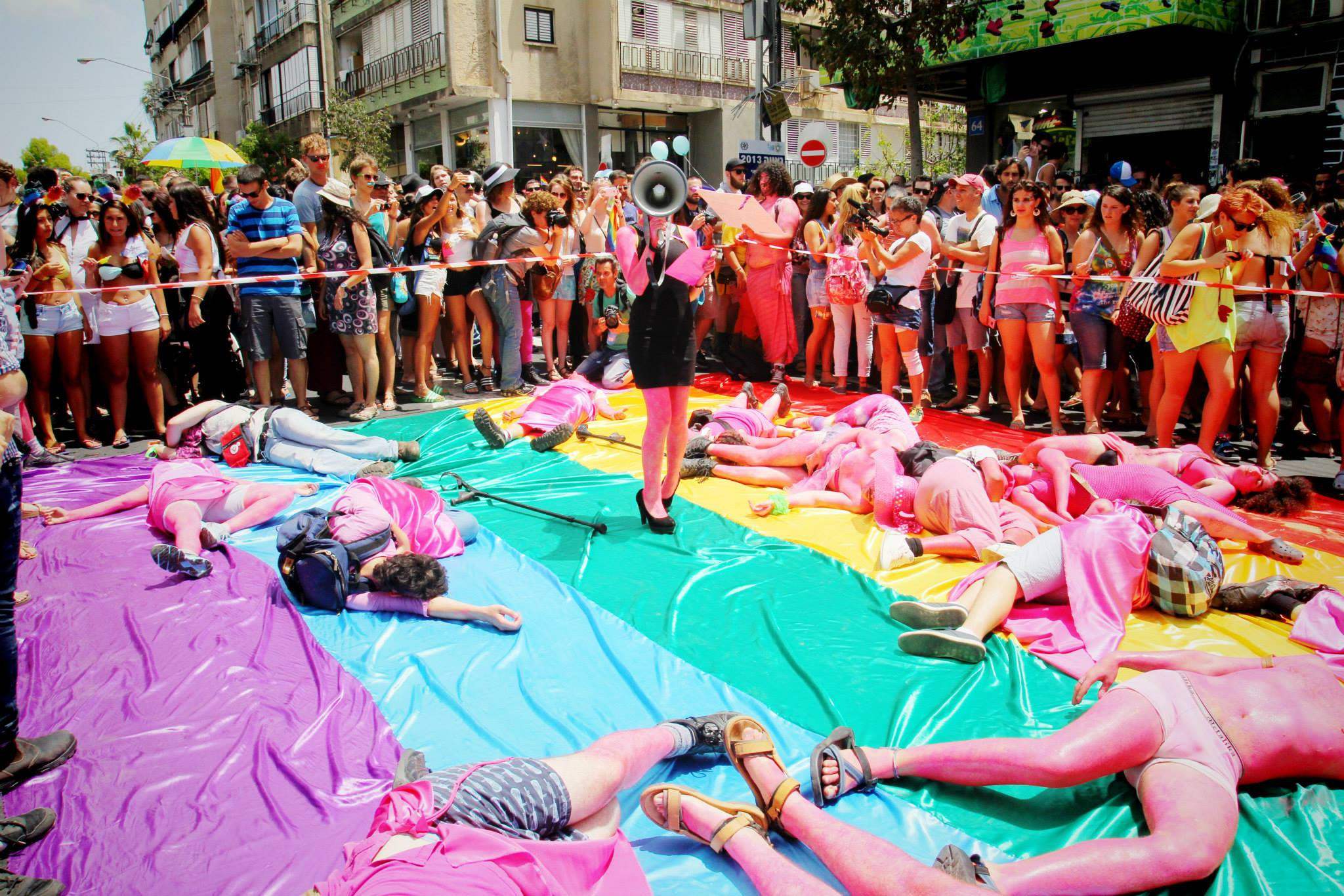
Anarcho-queer collective Mashpritzot hold a "die-in" protest against Israeli pinkwashing and the perceived homonormative priorities of the LGBTQ support center in the city.

"Pinkwashing" is a portmanteau compound word of the words "pink" and "whitewashing" that is used to describe a variety of marketing and political strategies aimed at promoting a product or an entity through an appeal to queer-friendliness, primarily by political or social activists. The phrase was originally coined by Breast Cancer Action to identify companies that claimed to support women with breast cancer while actually profiting from their illness.

== Contemporary growth and challenges (2020s) ==
The 2020s brought still more new advertisers and new challenges.

After creating a product in 2020 that resonated with transgender consumers—a credit card that allows customers to choose the name printed onto it—Citigroup and Mastercard launched its "True Name" campaign. It depicts a transgender man shopping at a convenience store without being judged or questioned because the name matches his gender identity.

After Oakland Raiders defensive end Carl Nassib became the first professional football player to come out as gay in 2021, the National Football League created a commercial that said, “Football is gay. Football is lesbian. Football is beautiful. Football is queer..." It ends with, "If you love this game, you are welcome here. Football is for all. Football is for everyone."

That same year, the United States Army created an animated recruitment video featuring a soldier "raised by two moms."

Meanwhile, corporations faced new backlash from conservative groups for LGBTQ+ inclusivity, while also being criticized for pinkwashing.

A 2021 study found that 25 major corporations, including CVS, AT&T, Walmart, and Comcast, advertised to LGBTQ+ consumers while simultaneously donating over $10 million to politicians opposing LGBTQ+ rights.

In 2023, Anheuser-Busch faced a Bud Light boycott after partnering with transgender influencer Dylan Mulvaney, leading to significant sales declines. Similarly, Target relocated Pride displays following conservative backlash. Yet the same year, Trojan (brand) partnered with gay influencer Kyle Krieger for its Bare Skin Raw condoms with a sexy, tennis-themed ad that received nearly 12,000 likes.

By 2025, 39% of companies reported scaling back LGBTQ+ marketing efforts, per research insights firm Gravity Research. The NYC Pride March, the largest Pride parade in the U.S. by attendance, experienced a $750,000 shortfall, with the loss of sponsorship from Mastercard, Target Corp. and Skyy vodka.

Despite challenges, many brands continued their Pride collections, including Levi's, Diesel, Guess, Abercrombie & Fitch, Hollister, Converse, Puma, and Vans.

In 2026, more corporations withdrew Pride sponsorships in several cities, including Salt Lake City, Louisville, St. Louis, Orlando, and Pittsburgh, which were down from previous years due largely to the Trump administration's dismantling of Diversity, Equity and Inclusion initiatives. Tampa Pride even announced a one-year hiatus after several corporations dropped their sponsorships

Nonetheless, many companies remained invested in annual Pride events, including Delta Air Lines, Marriott International, L’Oréal and Red Bull as top investors. NYC Pride added 11 more sponsors than 2025, including Yahoo and the return of Target Corp.

Many retail companies continued to create Pride collections, including Levi's, REI, Hot Topic, American Eagle Outfitters, Abercrombie & Fitch, Old Navy, Petco, PetSmart and others.

== History ==
LGBTQ marketing campaigns and advertisements (those specifically targeted toward lesbian, gay, bisexual, transgender, and queer consumers) began in the 1970s and have evolved significantly over subsequent decades, reflecting changing social attitudes and market opportunities. One of the first instances of the impact of the LGBTQ community in the marketing world was in 1973 when Coors Brewing Company was the subject of a boycott by the LGBTQ community. The LGBTQ community joined to protest Coors' hiring practices, since Coors used a polygraph test when going through the hiring process and specifically asked an employee about their sexual orientation. Coors ignored the boycott for several years, but made some concessions in 1978, and in 1995 began several countermeasures, including dropping the questions regarding homosexuality and extending domestic partnership benefits to its LGBTQ employees. The company also hired Mary Cheney as a marketing representative and began advertising in The Advocate and at events such as Denver's PrideFest.

In recent years, LGBTQ marketing has increasingly incorporated place-based and out-of-home (OOH) advertising strategies to reach audiences in physical environments associated with LGBTQ culture, services, and community life. These approaches emphasize contextual relevance by delivering messaging in locations where LGBTQ individuals naturally congregate or access resources, such as LGBTQ-friendly bars and clubs, community centers, college campuses, cafés, clinics, and neighborhood retail spaces.¹

Industry analyses suggest that place-based LGBTQ marketing can improve message credibility and engagement by situating campaigns within trusted community settings rather than relying exclusively on digital or mass-market channels. This approach has been applied across both commercial branding and public-health communication, including campaigns related to HIV prevention, mental health awareness, and substance-use education targeting LGBTQ populations.¹

Place-based strategies are also discussed in relation to critiques of “rainbow-washing,” a term used to describe short-term or symbolic LGBTQ marketing efforts—often concentrated around Pride Month—without sustained engagement or community investment. Marketing commentators argue that year-round, community-embedded advertising may help brands demonstrate longer-term commitment and authenticity.

=== Early development (1970s–1980s) ===
LGBTQ+ advertising emerged in the 1970s, initially focusing on gay men through local gay newspapers and magazines. Early advertisers were predominantly companies selling "sin products" such as alcohol and tobacco, along with entertainment media promoting films and music.

Beer and spirits brands, including Miller Lite, Budweiser, Coors Light, and Jägermeister, were among the first to target gay male consumers through advertisements in gay publications during the 1970s and 1980s.

National magazines such as Christopher Street (1976–1995) and Blueboy provided platforms for advertisers to reach gay audiences. Blueboy, which had a circulation of 135,000, became notable as the first gay-oriented business to go public on Wall Street. After Dark magazine, while not exclusively gay-oriented, also attracted advertisers seeking to reach its substantial gay readership among its 300,000 subscribers.

Absolut Vodka became a significant early adopter of consistent LGBTQ advertising, beginning in 1991 with regular back-cover advertisements in The Advocate and other publications, continuing this strategy for over 30 years.

=== Corporate expansion (1990s) ===
The 1990s marked a period of increased mainstream corporate interest in LGBTQ+ advertising. Out, launched in 1992, successfully attracted mainstream advertisers including Benetton Group, Absolut Vodka, Geffen Records, and Viking Press by positioning itself as a combination of established mainstream publications.

The HIV/AIDS epidemic led Burroughs Wellcome to run a national public service campaign urging people to test themselves for HIV. The company faced controversy because it sold AZT, a treatment for HIV/AIDS, and stood to profit from increased testing.

The Advocate, founded in 1967, underwent a major redesign in 1992 to appeal to corporate advertisers, removing adult-oriented advertisements and switching from newsprint to glossy paper.

By 1994, major corporations including Apple Computer, Philip Morris International, and Time Warner were actively pursuing gay consumers in LGBTQ+ magazines like Out and The Advocate.

A significant milestone occurred in 1994 when Swedish retailer IKEA aired what is considered the first mainstream television advertisement featuring a gay male couple. The commercial, which showed two men shopping for dining room furniture, aired only after 9:30 pm in select markets, including Los Angeles, New York, Philadelphia, and Washington, D.C. The advertisement generated controversy, including a bomb threat at a Long Island store.

Also in 1994, Subaru learnt that lesbians were among its top consumer segments and began targeting them in both LGBTQ+ and mainstream media. Some ads featured taglines with double meanings, such as “Get Out. And Stay Out” and “It's Not a Choice. It's the Way We're Built.” Subaru also developed a notable "gay vague" advertising strategy, designed to reach both gay and mainstream audiences. It featured billboards and print ads with coded references such as license plates reading "XENA-LVR" (referencing Xena: Warrior Princess, popular with lesbian audiences) and "P-TOWNIE" (referencing Provincetown, Massachusetts). The company later featured lesbian tennis player Martina Navratilova in commercials and LGBTQ-targeted print advertisements.

In 1995, when HIV/AIDS was taboo and there were no effective treatments yet, Nike ran an inspirational commercial featuring HIV-positive runner Ric Munoz, with its famous tagline, "Just do it," however it did not identify that he was gay.

=== Mainstream adoption (2000s–2010s) ===
The early 2000s saw expanded participation from automotive companies, with Jaguar, Volkswagen, and Volvo joining Saab, Saturn, and Subaru in advertising to LGBTQ+ consumers through national gay publications. By 2011, major corporations pursuing LGBTQ+ consumers included American Airlines, Campbell's, General Motors, Macy's, Orbitz, PepsiCo, Procter & Gamble, Unilever, and Wells Fargo. By 2019, numerous companies supported Pride globally, including Listerine, Tesco, Barclays, Amazon, M&S, Ralph Lauren, Boohoo, IKEA, Dr. Martens, Primark, Adidas, Under Armour, Converse, Skittles, Virgin Atlantic, Reebok, Levi’s, Apple, Banana Republic, Abercrombie & Fitch, Starbucks, ASOS, and Disney.

==== Health ====
As more HIV/AIDS treatments became available, Merck & Co. and ViiV Healthcare faced criticism for upbeat advertisements featuring attractive, muscled models, which some argued misrepresented the severity of the disease. Despite widespread increasing interest in LGBTQ+ marketing, Pfizer did not include gay men in its Viagra advertising campaigns.

Pharmaceutical companies started to include gay men in commercials by 2018. Gilead Sciences, maker of Truvada, aired TV commercials featuring a gay male couple, though the ads did not explicitly mention the drug or PrEP. A year later, Gilead Sciences introduced its first national TV campaign for Biktarvy featuring black, Latino, male, female, gay, bisexual and transgender actors.

An ad campaign in New York and Los Angeles warned gay men of the dangers of using Viagra with crystal meth and asked Pfizer to stop promoting the drug for sexual enhancement without proper warnings.

==== Retail ====
Retailers Gap and JCPenney attracted attention for their gay-inclusive ads in the early 2010s, including depictions of lesbians with wedding rings and their children in a Mother’s Day catalog. Later that year, JCPenney teamed up with lesbian comedian Ellen DeGeneres for a holiday commercial, which drew backlash from conservative group One Million Moms.

Target Corporation began selling Pride-themed merchandise and creating in-store Pride (LGBTQ culture) displays starting in 2015, contributing to the commercialization of Pride Month.

After Olympian Caitlyn Jenner transitioned around 2016, she appeared in campaigns from fashion retailer H&M and MAC Cosmetics, where she got her own brand of lipstick and 100% of the proceeds benefited the M.A.C. AIDS Fund Transgender Initiative.

=== NFL Super Bowls ===
A 1997 Holiday Inn Super Bowl commercial featuring a transgender woman who appears at her high school reunion was pulled after complaints.

LGBTQ+ themed ads began appearing during Super Bowls in the mid-2000s and then frequently during 2010s, often featuring well-known LGBTQ celebrities such as pop star Elton John for Doritos, comedian Ellen DeGeneres for Amazon Alexa, tennis star Billie Jean King for Dove (Unilever brand), rapper Lil Nas X for Doritos and Defy Logic, drag star RuPaul, who first appeared for WebEx then for Paramount Plus, Schitt's Creek actor Dan Levy (Canadian actor) for Homes.com, comedian Wanda Sykes for Novartis and Saturday Night Live star Kate McKinnon for Hellman's mayonnaise, along with Jonathan Van Ness of Netflix's Queer Eye (2018 TV series) for Pop-Tarts.

In 2005, Diet Pepsi won an award from LGBTQ+ advocacy group Commercial Closet Association for airing a Super Bowl spot featuring Queer Eye star Carson Kressley gawking at a handsome man on the street.

Another commercial that was pulled after the Super Bowl was for Snickers. In it, two male mechanics bite start eating opposite ends of a candy bar and end up accidentally "kissing." They try to overcompensate by ripping out their chest hair to prove they are not gay.

While playing “America the Beautiful," Coca-Cola celebrated diversity by showing a variety of people, including the first gay parents depicted in a Super Bowl ad, in 2014.

In the 2016 game, Mini Cooper ran its “Defy Labels” spot in which lesbian retired soccer player Abby Wambach called it a “gay” car while making air quotes.

A Coca-Cola commercial during the 2019 big game portrayed a lesbian couple and celebrated pronouns by saying, "There's a Coke for he -- and she -- and her -- and me -- and them."

For Super Bowl LIV in 2020, there were so many LGBTQ+ references (11 counted) that the game ads total was referred to as a "rainbow wave" by GLAAD. Drag queens Kim Chi and Miz Cracker from RuPaul's Drag Race appeared for hummus brand Sabra (company) in 2020.

Tying into both Valentine's Day and the 2023 big game, McDonald's included a real-life gay couple among a series of couples who demonstrate their love by knowing each other’s McDonald’s orders.

The 2024 game included a commercial with a lesbian wedding kiss from Volkswagen, along with inclusive ads from Hellman's and Homes.com featuring Kate McKinnon and Dan Levy.

LGBTQ celebrities increasingly appeared in large numbers during Super Bowl commercials but without references to their sexuality, ushering in a new era of "gay vague" inclusion. In 2025, ads in the game included Häagen-Dazs (Michelle Rodriguez), MSC Cruises (Drew Barrymore), Nike, Inc. (Sha’Carri Richardson and Doechii), Novartis (Wanda Sykes), Poppi (drink) (Jake Shane), and Ritz Crackers (Aubrey Plaza).

The following year, even more such ads appeared. During Super Bowl LX, the lineup of rainbow celebrities included talk show host Andy Cohen for Nerds Juicy Gummy Clusters, SNL comedian Bowen Yang for Ritz Crackers, and girl group Katseye, whose out members include Lara Raj and Megan Skiendiel, for State Farm. Levi's tapped Grammy-winning bisexual rapper Doechii, and Pokémon paired Young Miko, the lesbian Puerto Rican rapper with bisexual pop icon Lady Gaga.

==== Other ====
Viacom launched Logo TV in 2005 as an advertiser-supported, LGBTQ-targeted television network. The channel grew from serving 13 million homes at launch to more than 50 million by 2013.

McDonald's created its first gay-themed commercial in 2010 in France that went viral, featuring a young, gay man and his dad with the slogan “Come as you are.” Then in 2016, McDonald's Taiwan had another ad in which a young man who comes out to his dad that also went viral.

In 2013, Amazon ran a commercial for its Kindle Paperwhite, the first to use the word "husband" about a gay male couple, two years before nationwide marriage equality was legalized in the U.S.

General Mills entered the fray in 2014, with a Canadian Cheerios ad featuring two gay dads and their daughter.

A groundbreaking 2019 ad for Gillette razors depicted a father showing his transgender son how to shave for the first time.

The 2019 WorldPride march in New York City attracted over 3 million attendees, 150,000 marchers, and 70 corporate sponsors, including L'Oréal, which had 860 employees participate.

=== Market demographics ===
Early demographic research relied on Alfred Kinsey's studies (1948–1953), which suggested 10% of men were gay.

Contemporary estimates suggest LGBTQ+ individuals represent 7.6% of the U.S. population, with generational differences:

- Generation Z (ages 18–26): 28%
- Millennials (ages 27–42): 16%
- Baby Boomers (ages 59–77): 7%

The global LGBTQ+ community had an estimated $3.9 trillion in spending power in 2023. The United States Census recorded 646,500 same-sex couples in 2020.

== See also ==
- Advertising
- Commercial Closet Association
- Gay-friendly
- LGBTQ
- LGBT demographics
- LGBTQ community
- LGBTQ culture
- LGBTQ symbols
- Marketing
- Out Now Consulting
- Pink capitalism
- Pink Dollar
- Pinkwashing
- Project SCUM
- Pride Month
- Queerbaiting
- Trainbow
