= Demographics of sexual orientation =

Prevalence of different types of sexual orientation

Obtaining precise numbers on the demographics of sexual orientation is difficult for a variety of reasons, including the nature of the research questions. Most of the studies on sexual orientation rely on self-reported data, which may pose challenges to researchers because of the subject matter's sensitivity. Some studies examine self-reported data on same-sex sexual experiences, while other studies examine self-reported identification as homosexual, heterosexual or bisexual. Overall, fewer research subjects identify as homosexual or bisexual, than report having had sexual experiences or attraction to a person of the same sex. Survey type, questions and survey setting may affect the respondents' answers.

== General findings ==
A 2016 literature review identified four distinct but related aspects of sexual orientation: sexual behavior, sexual identity, sexual attraction, and physiological sexual arousal. The review noted that physiological arousal is more closely associated with other aspects of sexual orientation in men than in women. It states that there is no persuasive evidence that the demographics of sexual orientation have varied much across time or place. Bisexuality comes in varying degrees of relative attraction to the same or opposite sex. Men are more likely to be exclusively homosexual than to be equally attracted to both sexes, while the opposite is true for women.

Surveys in Western cultures find, on average, that about 93% of men and 87% of women identify as completely heterosexual, 4% of men and 10% of women as mostly heterosexual, 0.5% of men and 1% of women as evenly bisexual, 0.5% of men and 0.5% of women as mostly homosexual, and 2% of men and 0.5% of women as completely homosexual. An analysis of 67 studies found that the lifetime prevalence of sex between men (regardless of orientation) was 3–5% for East Asia, 6–12% for South and South East Asia, 6–15% for Eastern Europe, and 6–20% for Latin America. The International HIV/AIDS Alliance estimates a worldwide prevalence of men who have sex with men between 3 and 16 percent.

Some people, with estimates ranging between 0.4% to 1%, do not feel sexual attraction and identify as asexual, a sexual orientation in itself (or sometimes considered a lack thereof).

Estimating the demographics of sexual orientation on a global scale is a difficult task, because in many parts of the world discrimination has led people to conceal their sexual identities. Some cross-cultural research has suggested that male homosexuality is more prevalent in stratified societies and may not be a cultural universal, but the empirical findings, conceptual basis, and methodology of such research has been disputed by other cross-cultural researchers.

== By country ==
=== Worldwide ===
==== 2021 ====
In 2021, Ipsos interviewed people in 27 countries spanning all continents on their sexual orientation and gender identity. For some countries the samples were weighed for representativity, but in others with less internet access, they skewed more urban. In this survey, on average about 80% of people worldwide identified as heterosexual, 3% as gay, lesbian or homosexual, 4% as bisexual, 1% as pansexual or omnisexual, 1% as asexual, 1% as "other", and 11% do not know or will not say. Results indicated that significant differences in sexual identity have emerged between generations across the globe, with the youngest group, or Generation Z, being more likely to identify as bisexual (9%) than Millennials (4%), Generation X (3%) and Boomers (2%). Generation Z and Millennials were also more likely to identify as homosexual, with 4% and 3% doing so respectively, compared to 2% of Generation X and 1% of Boomers. In addition, the survey found that men are more likely than women to identify as homosexual (4% vs. 1%).

=== Australia ===
==== 2001–2002 ====
The then largest and most thorough survey in Australia was conducted by telephone interview with 19,307 respondents between the ages of 16 and 59 in 2001/2002. The study found that 97.4% of men identified as heterosexual, 1.6% as homosexual and 0.9% as bisexual. For women 97.7% identified as heterosexual, 0.8% as lesbian and 1.4% as bisexual. Nevertheless, 8.6% of men and 15.1% of women reported either feelings of attraction to the same gender or some sexual experience with the same gender. Overall, 8.6% of women and 5.9% of men reported some homosexual experience in their lives; these figures fell to 5.7% and 5.0% respectively when non-genital sexual experience was excluded. Half the men and two thirds of the women who had same-sex sexual experience regarded themselves as heterosexual rather than homosexual.

==== 2012–2013 ====
An update on the above study; it employs the same methodology, has a larger sample (20,055 respondents), and a broader respondent age range (16–69). The study found that 96.5% of the entire sample (or 96.8% of the men and 96.3% of the women) identified as heterosexual, a drop from the 2003 findings (97.5%). Homosexuals accounted for 1.9% of the male population and 1.2% of the female population, a non-significant difference between the sexes. Bisexuals accounted for 1.3% of the male population and 2.2% of the female population. Women were significantly more likely than men to identify as bisexual, and less likely to report exclusively other-sex or same-sex attraction and experience. Similarly, more women reported same-sex experience and same-sex attraction. Nine percent of men and 19% of women had some history of same-sex attraction or experience. More women identified as lesbian or bisexual than in 2001–02. Homosexual/gay identity was more common among men with university education and living in cities, and much less common among men with blue-collar jobs. Both male and female bisexuality were more common among respondents under the age of 20. Male bisexuality was also overrepresented among men in their sixties.

==== 2014 ====
In interviews with 180,000 Australians aged 14+, Roy Morgan Research reported in 2014 that 4.1% of men and 2.8% of women identified as homosexual. Men outnumbered women among homosexuals in all age groups. For both sexes, the share identifying as homosexual was highest in the 20–29 age group.

The 2014 General Social Survey, conducted by the Australian Bureau of Statistics, estimated that over half a million people, or 3% of the adult population, identified as gay, lesbian, or 'other'.

==== 2020 ====
A study conducted by BioMed Central estimated that 3.6% of males and 3.4% of females were gay, lesbian, bisexual, or another sexual minority.

=== Austria ===
A 2018 study reported that the percentage of people identifying as homosexual or bisexual in Austria was 6.2% (broken into 5.5% for males and 6.8% for females).

=== Brazil ===
==== 1998 ====
In a sample of 2,054 Brazilians aged 18 to 60 years of age, the Datafolha pollster found that 14% (or 15% of men and 13% of women) feel at least some same-sex attraction, while 70% did not feel any such attraction; the remaining 16% did not answer the question. Seventy-four percent of Brazilians said they never had a homosexual experience, 16% refused to answer the question, and 9% said they had some homosexual experience. The percentage with homosexual experience was higher among men (14%) than among women (5%), and higher also among those with more formal education (15%), singles (12%), and Northeasterners (11%). The non-religious (18%) and Pentecostal Protestants (11%) were more likely to have had homosexual experiences than Catholics (8%).

==== 2013 ====
In an Ibope survey with a sample of 2,363 Brazilian Internet users weighted for national representativity, 83% declared themselves heterosexual, 7% homosexual, 5% bisexual, 1% other, and 4% refused to disclose their orientation. Twice as many male internet users as females identified as gay or bisexual (16% vs. 8%). People aged 18–29 were the most likely to identify as non-heterosexual (15%), followed by those aged 30–49 (10%). Only 5% of the population aged 50 or more consider themselves gay or bisexual. Among non-heterosexuals, 42% said they had no religion, compared to 13% of the heterosexual population. The Class B (middle class) had the highest percentage of non-heterosexuals (14%), followed by Class A (upper class, 11%). Classes C and D (lower–middle and low classes) had 10% gays and bisexuals. Among the Brazilian regions, Northern Brazil had the lowest percentage of non-heterosexuals (2%). All other regions had percentages at or above 10%, with the Center-West reporting the highest (14%).

=== Canada ===
==== 2003–2014: Canadian Community Health Survey ====
	Gay/lesbian	Bisexual	Total
2003	1%	0.7%	1.7%
2005	1.1%	0.8%	1.9%
2007	—	—	2.1%
2009	1.1%	0.9%	2.0%
2012	1.3%	1.1%	2.4%
2014	1.7%	1.3%	3.0%

==== 2016 ====
A female-only survey found that 8% of Canadian women identify as gay or bisexual.

==== 2018 ====
In 2018, around 4% of the Canadian population identified as LGBT, according to Statistics Canada.

=== Czech Republic ===
==== 2015–2016 ====
In 2015, around 7% of men and 10% of women identified as gay, according to a survey of around 30,000 people by the Faculty of Science at Charles University in Prague. However, it was a survey of sexual behavior of Czechs and took about 90 minutes to complete, so only highly motivated people completed the survey. Research on sexual behavior continued in 2016, with some surveys of the research receiving up to 40,000 responses. According to the research, the number of non-heterosexual men in the Czech Republic is 6.7%, and 11.5% of women. The researchers said the numbers did not seem right to them, and they verified them multiple times in other surveys with other people, but they believe the data are credible.

==== 2023–2024 ====
According to a CzechSex research conducted by the National Institute of Mental Health (Národní ústav duševního zdraví), 3.1% of Czechs identify as bisexual, 2.0% as gay, and 0.6% as lesbian. An additional 0.3% of respondents selected "other," while both asexuality and pansexuality were each reported by 0.1%. 0.7% said they did not know yet, while 1.9% people indicated they do not understand the question. The representative research combined online (4,660 respondents) and face-to-face survey (2,009 respondents), aged 18 to 75. It also focused on topics such as sexual disorders, pornography, partner seeking or first sexual intercourse.

=== Denmark ===
A random survey found that 2.7% of the 1,373 men who responded to their questionnaire had homosexual experience (intercourse).

=== France ===
==== 1992 ====
A study of 20,055 people found that 4.1% of the men and 2.6% of the women had at least one occurrence of sexual relations with a person of the same sex during their lifetime.

==== 2011 ====
In a nationally representative online survey of 7,841 French adults carried out by IFOP in early 2011, 6.6% of respondents identified as homosexual (3.6%) or bisexual (3%), and 90.8% as heterosexual. Compared to the heterosexual population, the homosexual population was much more likely to be male, single, and younger than 65, as well as to be living alone. Homosexuals were more likely to be economically active and work in "superior intellectual professions" but on average had a smaller household income. They were also more likely to be residing in big cities, especially in the region of Paris. The bisexual population had fewer statistically significant deviations from the heterosexual population, resembling the heterosexuals on some measures, homosexuals on others, or being at a midpoint on still some others. However, they were more likely to be aged 18–24 than the other two groups. Like homosexuals, they were also more likely to be single.

In another IFOP survey of 9,515 French adults conducted later that same year, 6.5% of the sample identified as homosexual (3%) or bisexual (3.5%). Among LGBs, men outnumbered women by more than 2 to 1.

==== 2014 ====
Based in a survey with about 10,000 respondents, IFOP estimated that 90% of French people are heterosexual, 3% identify as bisexual, and 4% consider themselves homosexual. Two percent say they have not embraced a definition for their sexuality, and 1% did not wish to respond. More women than men are heterosexual (93% versus 86%), whereas more men than women identify as homosexual (7% v. 1%) and to a lesser extent bisexual (4% v. 2%). A homosexual or bisexual identity was more common in people aged 18–49 (9%) than among those aged 50–64 (6%) or over 65 (4%). More singles than people in relationships identified as homo- or bisexual (11% v. 6%). An LGB identity is also more common among people who said they have had more than 10 sex partners or none at all compared to those who have had intermediary levels of sexual experience. Catholics are more likely to identify as heterosexual (91%) than people who said they had some other religion or no religion whatsoever (88% each).

==== 2016 ====
A female-only survey found that 4% of French women identify as gay or bisexual. In the category of women aged less than 25, 9% identify as bisexual and 5% as lesbian.

In another IFOP survey of Paris residents, 79% of men and 70% of women identified as heterosexual, 13% of men and 15% of women as homosexual, and 7% of men and 18% of women as bisexual.

=== Germany ===
==== 2015 ====
According to Yougov, the following is how German adults are distributed along the Kinsey scale (by age):

Sexual orientation of Germans (N = 1,122)
Age category	Heterosexuality	Exclusive	Predominant	Predominant	Bisexuality	Common	Incidental	—N/a	Do not know
Age category	Homosexuality	—N/a	Incidental	Common	Bisexuality	Predominant	Predominant	Exclusive	Do not know
All adults		63%	10%	5%	4%	1%	1%	3%	13%
Adults aged 18–24		45%	20%	11%	5%	1%	2%	2%	13%

==== 2016 ====
In a nationally representative, face-to-face survey with over 2,500 Germans (55% female), it was found that 86% of men and 82% of women identify as exclusively heterosexual, 3% of men and 4% of women are mostly heterosexual, 1% of each sex declared themselves bisexual, and 1.5% as predominantly or exclusively homosexual. Other sexual orientations were reported by 3% of men and 4% of women. One percent of each sex was uncertain. Four percent of men and 7% of women gave no answer.

==== 2017 ====
A female-only survey found that 5% of German women identify as lesbian or bisexual.

=== Iran ===
In Iran, due to official and unofficial restrictions, clear and accurate information about the number of homosexuals has not been recorded. On the other hand, the Iranian government has always denied the identity of homosexuals. Iranian Former President Mahmoud Ahmadinejad, during his 2007 speech at Columbia University, asserted that there were no gay people in Iran. In 2018, a research called "Forbidden Tale" A comprehensive study on lesbian, gay, bisexuals (LGB) in Iran showed that in Iranian laws, for the reason of facing punishment such as flogging and imprisonment, male homosexuals refuse to publicly announce their sexual identity. On the other hand, social pressures and the fear of being rejected or judged have caused homosexuals to start a semi-secret life in Iran.

=== Ireland ===
==== 2006 ====
A study of the responses of 7,441 individuals, conducted by the ESRI, found that 2.7% of men and 1.2% of women self-identified as homosexual or bisexual. A question based on a variant of the Kinsey scale found that 5.3% of men and 5.8% of women reported some same-sex attraction. Of those surveyed, 7.1% of men and 4.7% of women reported a homosexual experience some time in their life so far. It also found that 4.4% of men and 1.4% of women reported a "genital same-sex experience" (oral or anal sex, or any other genital contact) in their life so far. The study was commissioned and published by the Crisis Pregnancy Agency in partnership with the Department of Health and Children.

=== Israel ===
==== 2012 ====
In a sample representative of the Israeli Jewish population aged 18 to 44, it was found that 11.3% of men and 15.2% of women self-reported attraction to the same gender, 10.2% and 8.7% reported lifetime same-gender encounters, while 8.2% and 4.8% self-identified as gay or bisexual men and lesbian or bisexual women, respectively. A non-heterosexual identity was more common in Tel Aviv than in other parts of the country and, among men, it was also correlated with younger age.

==== 2015 ====
In a survey employing the Kinsey scale, 4.5% of non-religious Israelis placed themselves on points 5 or 6 on the scale, indicating a homosexual orientation with minor or non-existent opposite-sex attraction, and 91.5% placed themselves on points 0 or 1, which indicates a heterosexual orientation with minor or non-existent same-sex attraction. In the category of young adults, aged 18 to 24, 7.4% placed themselves on Kinsey points 5 or 6, and 80% on points 0 or 1. Compared to the larger population, more young adults also placed themselves on point 3 of the Kinsey scale, meaning that equal attraction to both sexes (4.2% versus 1%), and on point 2, meaning a mostly heterosexual orientation with major homosexual attraction (7.4% v. 2.3%). Point 4 of the Kinsey scale, indicating a mostly homosexual orientation with major heterosexual attraction, contained a similar share of young adults and all adults (1.1% v. 0.7%).

=== Italy ===
==== 2011 ====
A random survey of 7,725 Italians (18–74 years old) conducted by the National Institute of Statistics between June and December 2011 with CAPI technique found that about 2.4% of the population declared to be homosexual or bisexual, 77% heterosexual, 0.1% transsexual, 4% reported to be "other", 15.6% did not answer. An extended survey including all the people that during their lives fell or are in love with a same-sex individual, or that had sexual intercourse with a same-sex individual, increases the percentage to 6.7% of the population. More men than women, more northerners than southerners, more younger than older people identified themselves as homosexuals. Members of 7725 families spread over 660 Italian municipalities took part in the survey.

==== 2016 ====
A female-only survey found that 1% of Italian women identify as gay or bisexual.

=== Japan ===
==== 2012 ====
A survey by the Dentsu group estimated that 5.2% of Japanese are LGBT.

==== 2015 ====
Dentsu's new estimate for the LGBT population of Japan was 7.6% for people aged 20 to 59.

==== 2018 ====
Dentsu's new estimate for the LGBT population of Japan was 8.9% for people aged 20 to 59.

=== Mexico ===
==== 2017 ====
According to a nationally representative study organized by Kantar TNS, 88% of Mexican men aged 18 to 30 years identify as heterosexual, 6% as homosexual, 5% as bisexual, and 1% as other.

=== Netherlands ===
==== 2001 ====
In a face-to-face survey carried out by the Dutch National Survey of General Practice, of the 4,229 men with a valid answer to the sexual orientation question, 1.5% self-identified as gay, 0.6% as bisexual and 97.9% as heterosexual. Of the 5,282 women, 1.5% self-identified as lesbian, 1.2% as bisexual, and 97.3% as heterosexual.

==== 2016 ====
A female-only survey found that 8% of Dutch women identify as gay or bisexual.

==== 2023 ====
A 2024 study by Statistics Netherlands analyzed the data from the "Veiligheidsmonitor 2023", a periodic population-based study of safety, livability and victimization of common crime. It estimates that about 18% (2.7 million people) of the Dutch population are LGBTQIA. It further estimates that 17% (2.5 million) of Dutch people have a non-heterosexual orientation, 1% (151 thousand) is transgender/nonbinary/genderqueer and 0.3% (45 thousand) are intersex people. 11% are reported to be "bi-plus" (or bisexual), 2% homosexual men, 1% asexual women, 1% homosexual women and 1% asexual men. Furthermore, 1% of people stated that they do not know who they are attracted to (yet).

=== New Zealand ===
==== 2007 ====
In an anonymous survey of 8,000 New Zealand secondary school students conducted by the University of Auckland, 0.9% of those surveyed reported exclusive attraction to the same sex, 3.3% to both sexes and 1.8% to neither.

==== 1993–2011 ====
The Dunedin Multidisciplinary Health and Development Study is a prospective study that looked at changes in sexual behavior, attraction, and identity among around 1,000 New Zealanders born in 1972 or 1973. Samples were first interviewed in 1993, when they were 21, and again at ages 26, 32, and 38, in 2010/2011. The study found a strong decrease in the share of women who self-reported exclusive heterosexual attraction from age 21 (88.3%) to age 26 (82.5%), but a small increase at age 32 (84.2%) and again at 38 (87.6%). By contrast, among men, the share self-reporting exclusive heterosexual attraction remained largely stable between ages 21 (94.9%) and 32 (94.2%), with a small decrease at age 38 (92.9%). Sexual identity was only assessed at ages 32 and 38. At age 32, 0.9% of women and 1.3% of men self-identified as gay, and 2.9% of women and 1.7% of men as bisexual. Additionally, 1.5% of women and 2.2% of men identified as "other". At age 38, 1.1% of women and 1.7% of men self-identified as gay, and 2.6% of women and 3% of men as bisexual, with 1.1% of women and 0.2% of men identifying as "other". While sexual attraction changed more for women than for men, changes among men were more consistently to greater homosexuality, while changes among women past age 26 occurred equally in both directions (i.e., to both more and less heterosexual attraction). Researchers discussed several factors behind the changes, from age effects to cultural effects, with homosexuality, especially female homosexuality, becoming more socially acceptable in the West in the 1990s and 2000s.

==== 2013–2014 ====
According to results from the fifth wave of the New Zealand Attitudes and Values Study, which interviewed over 14,000 people about their sexual orientation, 94.3% of New Zealanders identify as heterosexual, 2.6% as gay or lesbian, 1.8% as bisexual, 0.6% as bicurious, 0.5% as pansexual, and 0.3% as asexual. No gender differences were found in the share of New Zealanders identifying as heterosexual (94.1% of men and 94.4% of women) or pansexual (0.5% of both men and women), but men were more likely to identify as gay (3.5%) than women (1.8%), and women were more likely than men to identify as bisexual (2.1% versus 1.5%), bicurious (0.7% v. 0.4%) and asexual (0.4% v. 0.1%). Women in all the non-heterosexual categories were significantly younger than women in the heterosexual category. Men in the gay, bisexual, and bicurious categories were also significantly younger than heterosexual men.

=== Norway ===
==== 1988 ====
In a random survey of 6,300 Norwegians, 3.5% of the men and 3% of the women reported that they had a homosexual experience sometime in their life.

==== 2003 ====
In an anonymous survey of 1,971 male high school students performed in 2003, 1% self-reported having had a boyfriend and 2% having fallen in love with a man.

=== Philippines ===
The Young Adult Fertility and Sexuality Survey conducted in 2013 by the University of the Philippines found that 96.2% of youth describe themselves as straight/heterosexual. 2.1% described themselves as gay or lesbian while 1.7% are bisexual. 2.4% of men described themselves as gay, while 1.8% of women described themselves as lesbian.

=== Poland ===
A volunteer-based research of adult Poles showed that different modes of survey produce significant differences in the share of people who admit homosexual attraction. In paper-based surveys, 6% of respondents self-reported same-sex attraction, compared to 12% of online respondents. There were no other significant differences in other aspects of sexual life, and the two sets of volunteers were similar in age, education, and geographical location.

Another study showed that 4.9% of Poles identified as LGBT (5.5% for males and 4.3% for females).

=== Pakistan ===
In a 2013 questionnaire study of 2400 Pakistani males, 62 were exclusively homosexual (2.6%) and 146 were bisexual (6%).

=== Portugal ===
==== 2005 ====
A national survey from 2005 by Eurosondagem for the weekly national newspaper Expresso, estimated that about 9.9% (1 million) of the Portuguese people are homosexual or bisexual. This study used anonymous and confidential surveys. For people more than 15 years old, 7% stated that they are homosexual, 2.9% that they are bisexual and 90.1% are heterosexual. Among those who indicate that they are homosexual or bisexual, there was no major difference between men (7.3% and 2.8%) and women (6.8% and 3%) respectively. Only about 50% of LGB people in Portugal are socially open about their sexual orientation.

==== 2012 ====
Another survey from 2012 for the same weekly newspaper, with 1,220 respondents more than 18 years old, used a 100 question survey about sexuality. They found that 77.5% are exclusively heterosexual, 2.1% are predominantly heterosexual, 0.6% are bisexual, 0.4% are predominantly homosexual and 1.6% are exclusively homosexual. 17.8% preferred not to answer about their sexual orientation. Of those who identified as heterosexual, 5.7% claimed to have already kissed, 1.3% claimed to feel attraction, and 1% claimed to have already had sex with someone of the same sex.

=== South Africa ===
In a 2016 report titled: 'Progressive Prudes: A Survey of Attitudes towards Homosexuality and Gender Non-Conformity in South Africa' produced by the Other Foundation and the Human Sciences Research Council, found that 530,000 men and women of all population groups, both rural and urban dwelling, and across age groups, self-identify as either homosexual, bisexual, or gender non-conforming.

=== South Korea ===
In 2019, an OECD report noted that "Korea does not have any nationally representative survey that includes a survey question on self-identification as heterosexual, homosexual, or bisexual, nor does it collect information on the share of transgender people among the adult population."

=== Spain ===
==== 2016 ====
A female-only survey found that 6% of Spanish women identify as gay or bisexual.

==== 2017: Barómetro Control ====
The sixth edition of the Barómetro Control sexual behavior survey, which was performed in 2017, and is representative of the Spanish population aged 18 to 35, found that 89% of young Spanish adults identify as heterosexual, 6% as male homosexual, 3% as female homosexual, and 2% as bisexual.

=== Sri Lanka ===
==== 2021 ====
A flagship survey conducted by Equal Ground, a leading queer rights organization in Sri Lanka identified that approximately 12% of Sri Lanka's adult population identifies as LGBTQ+, with 8% identifying as bisexual, 0.5% as gay, 0.5% as lesbian, 1% as transgender, and 2% as "other".

=== Sweden ===
In an anonymous survey of 1,978 male high school students performed in 2003, respondents answered a question regarding same-sex attraction by choosing a number in a 5-point Likert scale (1 = no and 5 = strong). Those who marked the number 5 made up 4% of the sample and those who marked the numbers 3 or 4, presented by researchers as self-reporting "some" same-sex attraction, 7 percent.

=== Thailand ===
According to 2018 estimates from LGBT Capital, there were about 4.2 million LGBT people in Thailand.

Sexual identification of the UK overtime from ONS estimations

=== United Kingdom ===
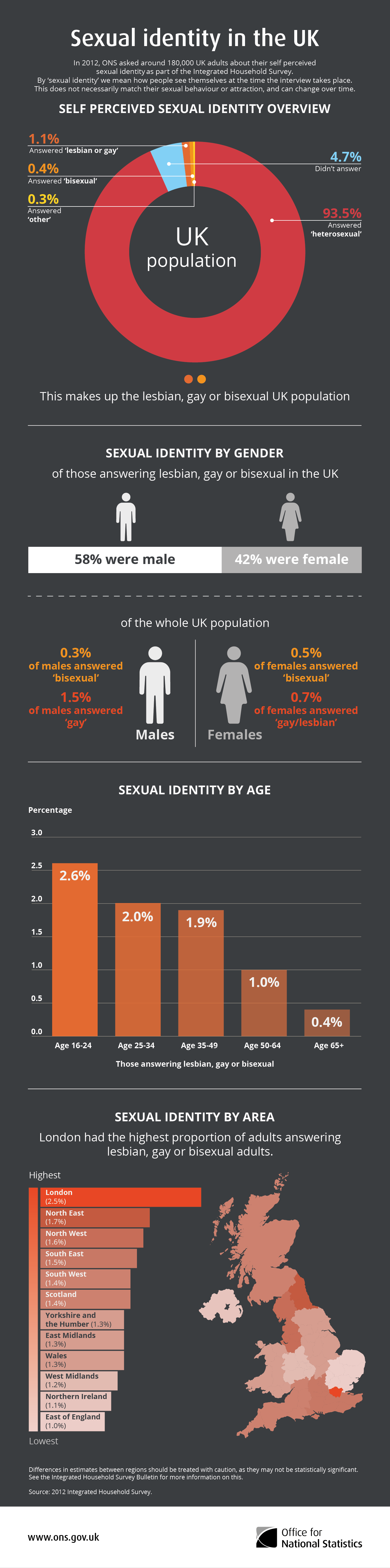
Sexual identity in the UK, 2012

==== 1992 ====
A study of 8,337 British men found that 6.1% have had a "homosexual experience" and 3.6% had "1+ homosexual partner ever."

==== 2005 ====
HM Treasury and the Department of Trade and Industry completed a survey to help the government analyze the financial implications of the Civil Partnerships Act (such as pensions, inheritance and tax benefits). They concluded that there were 3.6 million gay people in Britain—around 6% of the total population or 1 in 16.66 people.

==== 2008 ====
In a survey of around 1,000 Britons using a self-completed questionnaire, 2% of the total sample identified as bisexual, 4% as homosexual, and 92% as heterosexual.

==== 2009 ====
In an online survey with over 75,000 YouGov panelists in Britain, 90.9% identified as heterosexual, 5.8% as gay, lesbian or bisexual, 1.3% opted not to give an answer, and 2.1% gave other reasons. The sample was recruited to closely match the overall British population on demographic variables such as age, gender, employment status and socio-economic classification. Among men, around 89% identified as heterosexual, 5.5% identified as gay, and 2.5% as bisexual. Straight women constituted around 93% of all women, lesbians were 1.4%, and bisexual women 2.3 percent. A little over two percent of each sex identified as "Other", and a little over 1% did not want to indicate a sexual orientation. Non-heterosexuals tended to be younger, and this was especially the case for bisexual women and gay men, whose average ages were 32 and 36 respectively, compared to an average of 47 among heterosexuals. Ethnic minorities were less likely to identify as gay or lesbian than whites (1.4% vs. 3.5%) but were more likely to prefer not to disclose their sexual orientation (7.5% vs 0.9%). Sexual minorities tended to concentrate more in certain parts of the country—in London especially, where 27% of gay men and lesbians, as well as 19% of bisexuals, took residence, compared to only 14% of heterosexuals. Employment status also correlated with sexual orientation, as more gay than straight men worked full-time (three-quarters v. 57%), and the same was true among women (lesbians: 58%, straight women: 41%). Similarly, gay men (73%) and lesbians (66%) were overrepresented among the upper classes (classes ABC1), though the difference between heterosexuals and bisexuals (54% v. 58%) was not statistically significant. LGB people—especially lesbians—also had on average higher educational achievement.

The study argued for the need to provide strong anonymity to respondents in order to gauge the true size of the non-heterosexual population, as more LGB than heterosexual respondents indicated they would be less likely to disclose their true sexual orientation in a face-to-face interview than in a self-administered, online survey.

==== 2014 ====
In an anonymous online sex survey carried out by The Observer on the sex lives of the British, 4% of the 1,052 samples surveyed identified as gay or lesbian, and another 4% as bisexual.

In a nationally representative Survation study of 1,003 British women, 92% identified as heterosexual, 1.6% as gay or lesbian, 3.5% as bisexual, 0.3% as other, and 2.6% refused to disclose their sexual orientation. Sexual orientation appeared to be linked with age. Millennial women, aged 18–34, were significantly more likely to identify as bisexual (6.6%) than women aged 35–54 (1.4%) or older women (0.7%). Age differences were smaller for lesbian identity, but the pattern was the same, with 1.9% younger women identifying as lesbian, compared with 1.6% of middle aged and 1.3% of older women. Heterosexual identity followed the opposite pattern, being highest among older women (95.3%) and lowest among Millennials (89.1%). Sexual identity was also strongly correlated with childlessness, with 9.6% of childless women identifying as gay or bisexual, compared with 3.6% of women with underage children, and 0.5% of women with adult children.

==== 2015 ====
In a YouGov survey of 1,632 adults, 5.5% identified as gay, 2.1% as bisexual, and 88.7% as heterosexual. Asked to place themselves on the Kinsey scale, 72% of all adults, and 46% of adults aged 18–24 years, picked a score of zero, meaning that they identify as totally heterosexual. Four percent of the total sample, and 6% of young adults, picked a score of six, meaning a totally homosexual identity. Sex researcher Simon LeVay criticized this survey as unreliable because the respondents were not randomly sampled from the entire population.

==== 2009–2016: Integrated Household Survey ====
	Heterosexual	Gay/lesbian	Bisexual	Other	Don't know/Refuse/No response
2009	94.2%	0.9%	0.5%	0.5%	3.8%
2010	94.0%	1.0%	0.5%	0.4%	4.3%
2011	93.9%	1.1%	0.4%	0.3%	4.2%
2012	94.4%	1.1%	0.5%	0.3%	3.8%
2013	93.6%	1.1%	0.5%	0.3%	4.5%
2014	93.8%	1.1%	0.5%	0.3%	4.3%
2015	93.7%	1.1%	0.6%	0.4%	4.1%
2016	93.4%	1.2%	0.8%	0.5%	4.1%

In all years, it was observed that an LGB identity is most common among London residents and those aged under 35. Homosexual identity in 2016 was more than twice as common among men (1.7%) than among women (0.7%), whereas bisexual identity was more common among women (0.9%) than men (0.6%).

==== 2016 ====
A female-only survey found that 4% of British women identify as gay or bisexual.

The United Kingdom Office for National Statistics Annual Population Survey reported over 1 million (2.0%) of the UK population aged 16 and over identified as Lesbian, Gay or Bisexual (LGB). This represented a statistically significant increase from 1.7% in 2015.

==== 2017 ====
In a Survation poll on adults aged 40–70, 92.5% identified as heterosexual, 3.5% as gay, 2.4% as bisexual, 0.5% as Other and 1% did not want to reveal their sexual orientation. Those under 60 were less likely to identify as heterosexual than those aged 60–70. A gay identity was more common among men (6.1%) than women (1%), and the opposite was true of heterosexuality (men: 89.9%, women: 95%). No differences were found in the share identifying as bisexual (2.4% versus 2.5%). London had a higher share of middle aged or older people identifying as gay (8%) or bisexual (6%) than other parts of the country.

According to a nationally representative study organized by Kantar TNS, 87% of British men aged 18 to 30 years identify as heterosexual, 7% as homosexual, 5% as bisexual, and 2% as other.

An Ipsos MORI survey on behalf of BBC found that British people aged 16–22 (also called Generation Z) have lower odds to identify as exclusively straight (66%) than those who belong to the Millennial generation (71%), Generation X (85%), or Baby boomers (88%). Within Generation Z, there were several important gender differences in sexual identity: young men were more likely to identify as completely heterosexual than young women (73% v. 59%) whereas young women had higher chances to identify as non-exclusively straight (19%) and bisexual (14%) than young men (10% and 5%, respectively). There were no significant gender differences in the share identifying as predominantly or exclusively homosexual (5% for each sex), but Generation Z men were significantly more likely to refuse to disclose their sexual orientation (7%) than their female counterparts (3%). Significantly more white youth identified as exclusively homosexual (3%) than those of ethnic minority backgrounds (0%) but no other ethnic differences were found. Exclusively heterosexual youths were also less likely to describe themselves as fairly or very active in politics, but they were more likely to believe that they enjoy a better life than Millennials.

Among older adults, there were no differences in the share of men (82%) and women (80%) identifying as exclusively heterosexual. But more women than men identified as mostly heterosexual (11% v. 6%), while more men than women identified as exclusively homosexual (4% v. 2%) and mostly homosexual (2% v. 0.4%). Exclusive heterosexuals were more likely to have voted "Leave" on the 2016 UK referendum to leave the European Union, whereas mostly heterosexuals and exclusive homosexuals were overrepresented among "Remain" voters.

==== 2019 ====
The Annual Population Survey reported that an estimated 2.7% of the population aged 16 or over identified as lesbian, gay, or bisexual.

==== 2021 ====
For the first time, the 2021–2022 United Kingdom censuses included a question on sexual orientation.

Results of the 2021–2022 United Kingdom censuses
Sexual orientation (aged 16 and over)	England and Wales	Northern Ireland	Scotland
Straight or heterosexual	89.4%	90.0%	87.8%
Gay or Lesbian	1.5%	1.2%	1.8%
Bisexual	1.3%	0.8%	1.8%
All other sexual orientations	0.3%	0.2%	0.5%
Not answered	7.5%	7.9%	8.2%

=== United States ===
The demographics of sexual orientation and gender identity in the United States have been studied in the social sciences in recent decades. A 2017 Gallup poll concluded that 4.5% of adult Americans identified as LGBT with 5.1% of women identifying as LGBT, compared with 3.9% of men. A different survey in 2016, from the Williams Institute, estimated that 0.6% of U.S. adults identify as transgender. According to an estimate based on UNAIDS 2018 data, there are at least 4.5 million gay or bisexual men in the United States.

Data scientist Seth Stephens-Davidowitz reported that the actual prevalence of gay men does not appear to vary between states in the U.S. because the percentage of Internet porn searches that are for gay male porn are nearly the same in all states, about 5 percent. Stephens-Davidowitz argues that in states where there is a social stigma against homosexuality that "many more gay men are in the closet than are out". Less than ten years following the United States v. Windsor (2013) and Obergefell v. Hodges (2015) U.S. Supreme Court decisions, Gallup found that nationwide public support for same-sex marriage had increased to 70% in 2021 while same-sex married couples accounted for 0.5% of all U.S. households and unmarried same-sex couples accounted for 0.4% of all U.S. households in the 2020 United States census.

== Major cities ==
=== United States ===
==== 2011 ====
The Williams Institute at UCLA School of Law, a sexual orientation law think tank, released a study in April 2011 estimating based on its research that 1.7 percent of American adults identify as gay or lesbian, while another 1.8 percent identify as bisexual. Drawing on information from four national and two state-level population-based surveys, the analyses suggest that there are more than 8 million adults in the US who are lesbian, gay, or bisexual, comprising 3.5% of the adult population. Of men, 2.2% identify as gay and an additional 1.4% as bisexual. Of women, 1.1% identify as lesbian and an additional 2.2% as bisexual.

These charts show lists of the cities and the metropolitan areas with the highest LGB population in terms of numbers of total gay, lesbian and bisexual residents, based on estimates published in 2006 by the Williams Institute of the UCLA School of Law.

Top ranked by percent:

Rank	City	Percentage of city population	LGB population	
Rank	City	Percentage of city population	population	rank
1	San Francisco	15.4%	94,234	4
2	Seattle	12.9%	57,993	9
3	Atlanta	12.8%	39,805	12
4	Minneapolis	12.5%	34,295	16
5	Boston	12.3%	50,540	10
6	Sacramento	9.8%	32,108	20
7	Portland	8.8%	35,413	14
8	Denver	8.2%	33,698	17
9	Washington	8.1%	32,599	18
10	Orlando	7.7%	12,508	36

Top ranked by total population:

Rank	City	Percentage of city population	LGB population	
Rank	City	Percentage of city population	population	rank
1	New York City	6%	272,493	1
2	Los Angeles	5.6%	154,270	2
3	Chicago	5.7%	114,449	3
4	San Francisco	15.4%	94,234	4
5	Phoenix	6.4%	63,222	5
6	Houston	4.4%	61,976	6
7	San Diego	6.8%	61,945	7
8	Dallas	7.0%	58,473	8
9	Seattle	12.9%	57,993	9
10	Boston	12.3%	50,540	10
11	Philadelphia	4.2%	43,320	11
12	Atlanta	12.8%	39,085	12
13	San Jose	5.8%	37,260	13

Major metropolitan areas by total population:

Rank	City	LGB	LGB% population
1	New York City – Northern New Jersey – Long Island, NY	568,903	2.6%
2	Los Angeles – Long Beach, California – Santa Ana, California	442,211	2.7%
3	Chicago–Naperville–Joliet, Illinois	288,478	3.1%
4	San Francisco – Oakland – San Jose, California	256,313	3.6%
5	Boston – Cambridge, Massachusetts – Quincy, Massachusetts	201,344	3.4%
6	Washington, D.C.	191,959	2.5%
7	Dallas – Fort Worth – Arlington, Texas	183,718	3.5%
8	Miami – Miami Beach – Fort Lauderdale	183,346	4.7%
9	Atlanta – Marietta, Georgia – Sandy Springs, Georgia	180,168	4.3%
10	Philadelphia – Camden, New Jersey – Wilmington, Delaware	179,459	2.8%

== Research issues ==
=== Incidence versus prevalence ===
A significant distinction can be made between what medical statisticians call incidence and prevalence. For example, even if two studies agree on a common criterion for defining a sexual orientation, one study might regard this as applying to any person who has ever met this criterion, whereas another might only regard that person as being so if they had done so during the year of the survey. According to the American Psychological Association, sexual orientation refers to an "enduring pattern of emotional, romantic, and/or sexual attractions to men, women, or both sexes", as well as to "a person's sense of identity based on those attractions, related behaviors, and membership in a community of others who share those attractions." Therefore, a person can be celibate and still identify as being bisexual or homosexual based on romantic proclivities.

=== Effect of survey mode ===
According to many a source, from academic researchers to pollsters to market research groups, the population that identifies as LGBT and/or has had sexual relations with the same sex may be underestimated in surveys that employ live interviewers to collect data. Their argument is that methods stronger in anonymity and/or confidentiality, such as online questionnaires and IVR interviews, are better than more traditional survey modes at gauging the size of the non-heterosexual population.

British researchers with the third wave of the National Survey of Sexual Attitudes and Lifestyles (NATSAL) addressed this matter in one of their studies. Interviewers collected data on sexual behavior from a sample of over 15,000 subjects at their home. However, a portion of respondents agreed to complete an online questionnaire asking many of the same questions asked live before. The questionnaire was to be taken one to two months after the original interview. The data below were extracted from the same group of 202 men and 325 women who gave out information about same-sex experiences live and then successfully completed the online questionnaire later. Numbers show how answers varied between survey modes and the information is given on whether the difference between methods was significant or not.

Partial data from the NATSAL-3	Any same-sex experience			Any same-sex sex (experience with genital contact)		
Partial data from the NATSAL-3	Face-to-face	Online	Statistically significant difference between methods?	Face-to-face	Online	Statistically significant difference between methods?
Men	11.4%	17.3%	Yes	9.9%	13.5%	Yes
Women	14.5%	19.7%	Yes	9.2%	10.5%	No

Researchers from other countries have produced similar findings. In Poland, for example, it was found in an experiment that self-reporting same-sex attraction was twice as common using an online questionnaire as in a paper questionnaire, despite the fact that the group that answered the online questions and the one that filled out the paper form were similar on all demographic variables and on all other aspects of their sexuality. In the 90s, an experiment was made in the US where it was found that teen males were several times more likely to acknowledge same-sex experiences using a computer methodology compared to paper questionnaires.

=== Change in prevalence over time ===
In addition, shifts can occur in reports of the prevalence of homosexuality. For example, the Hamburg Institute for Sexual Research conducted a survey over the sexual behavior of young people in 1970 and repeated it in 1990. Whereas in 1970 18% of the boys ages 16 and 17 reported to have had at least one same-sex sexual experience, the number had dropped to 2% by 1990.

Data from the General Social Survey shows that the percentage of Americans reporting predominantly same-sex partners remained stable between 1989 and 2014. In contrast, the percentage who reported ever having a same-sex partner increased. By contrast, the National Survey of Family Growth has found an increase in the share of men and women who self-report a bisexual orientation in their 2011–2013 study compared to previous surveys. Likewise, in the Second Australian Study of Health and Relationships, whose data was collected in 2012 and 2013, researchers noticed significant growth in the share of women who report bisexual orientation and attraction, and the share of men who report exclusive homosexual attraction, compared to the results of the First Australian Study of Health and Relationships, executed in 2001.

=== Cultural perceptions ===
The population that has come to be referred to as gay in the West is not a descriptive term that would be recognized by all men who have sex with men (MSM) as known in the rest of the world. While gay culture is increasingly open and discussed, the world of MSM consists of a diverse population that often may respond differently depending on how communications in clinical settings are framed. Gay is generally used to describe a homosexual sexual orientation, while MSM describes sexual behavior between men.

Some men who have sex with other men will not relate to the term gay or homosexual, and do not regard sexual activity with other men as actual sexual activity. Instead, they view sexual relations with women as valid. This is particularly true among individuals from non-Western cultures, but it is also common in the US. Terms such as MSM or same gender loving are often used in place of the word gay. Men in Africa and Latin America engage in sexual relationships with other men while still referring to themselves as heterosexual, which is known as being on the "down-low".

There is a relative lack of information on sexual behavior in most developing countries. The limited sources that are available indicate that although homosexual self-identification might occur relatively infrequently, the prevalence of homosexual behavior is higher. These men are not taken into consideration in some sexual identity surveys which may lead to under-reporting and inaccuracies.

=== Importance of having reliable demographics ===
Reliable data on the size of the gay and lesbian population would be valuable for informing public policy. For example, demographics would help calculate the costs and benefits of domestic partnership benefits, or the impact of legalizing gay adoption. Further, knowledge of the size of the "gay and lesbian population holds promise for helping social scientists understand a wide array of important questions—questions about the general nature of labor market choices, accumulation of human capital, specialization within households, discrimination, and decisions about geographic location." More data are also needed to understand the degree of underrepresentation of sexual minorities in certain fields such as STEM, as well as the academic performance of sexual minorities more broadly.

== Kinsey Reports ==
Two of the most famous studies of the demographics of human sexual orientation were Alfred Kinsey's Sexual Behavior in the Human Male (1948) and Sexual Behavior in the Human Female (1953). These studies used a seven-point spectrum to define sexual behavior, from 0 for completely heterosexual to 6 for completely homosexual. Kinsey concluded that a small percentage of the population were to one degree or another bisexual (falling on the scale from 1 to 5). He also reported that 37% of men in the U.S. had achieved orgasm through contact with another male after adolescence and 13% of women had achieved orgasm through contact with another woman.

His results, however, have been disputed, especially in 1954 by a team consisting of John Tukey, Frederick Mosteller and William G. Cochran, who stated much of Kinsey's work was based on convenience samples rather than random samples, and thus would have been vulnerable to bias.

Paul Gebhard, Kinsey's former colleague and successor as director of the Kinsey Institute for Sex Research, reviewed the Kinsey data and removed what he thought were its purported contaminants. He again found that almost exactly 37% of men had engaged in homosexual activity. However, he also pointed out that Kinsey later concluded it was a mistake trying to generalize to the entire population.

More recent researchers believe that Kinsey overestimated the rate of same-sex attraction because of flaws in his sampling methods.

== See also ==
- Biology and sexual orientation
- Outline of LGBT topics (includes a categorisation of sexual orientations)
- Sexual diversity: explains the concepts of and differences between sexual orientation, sexual identity, and gender identity
- Sexual fluidity#Demographics
