= Out Now Consulting =

Out Now
- Company type: Company
- Industry: Marketing
- Genre: Gay marketing specialist
- Founded: 1992/2001
- Founder: Ian Johnson
- Headquarters: Australia, Netherlands
- Area served: Europe, US, Australia
- Services: Market research, strategy, advertising, PR, training
- Parent: Significant Others
- Website: http://OutNowConsulting.com/

Out Now Consulting is a marketing agency that provides specialised gay marketing services to large companies by researching gay lifestyles and using the information to develop strategies to target gay and lesbian consumers.

== Origins ==
Although Out Now is a Dutch company, its origins lie in the formation of an Australian company, Significant Others, which after its establishment in 1992 became known in Australian media over subsequent years for its work as a specialist gay marketing agency.

Significant Others presented the Keynote address at the world's first gay marketing conference in 1994.

Following the establishment of an office in Amsterdam, Out Now became the first business of its kind with agencies in more than one country.

Activities are now undertaken in the US, UK, Germany, Belgium, France, Ireland and The Netherlands markets.

Out Now's role in the development of gay marketing in various countries has been discussed in the Dutch language edition of 'Principes van Marketing' (Principles of Marketing) - a marketing textbook - by Dr. Philip Kotler.

== Areas of work ==
The company works in five areas: market research, advertising, training, PR and strategy development and is cited by mainstream media as an authority on gay consumer issues.

Out Now won a Commercial Closet Association 'Images In Advertising' award in New York (June 11, 2007) in the "Outstanding Interactive" campaign category for an online promotion for Lufthansa.

The agency has initiated research projects for gay and lesbian media in several countries including Sydney Star Observer, DNA Magazine (Australia), Gay Community News (Ireland), Diva, Gay Times, Bent (United Kingdom) and De Gay Krant (Netherlands), such research usually being the first marketing analysis of gay consumers.

The resulting findings have been reported in various international media.

Other work includes social research - such as a 2004 work on discrimination in the Netherlands.

== Industry role ==
In June 2006, the MD of Out Now Consulting was Keynote speaker for the Pink Pound Conference held in London.

In November 2006 Out Now presented a Keynote seminar at the world's second largest travel conference, London World Travel Market.

Out Now presented at the February 2007 Marketing For Good event in London which for the first time considered gay marketing topics.

In August 2007 the Market Research Society reported that Out Now was to undertake a "major survey of the lifestyles and spending power of the UK's three million gay consumers".

In February 2015, the firm became the first organization in the world to be allocated a dedicated .LGBT domain name".

== 'So gay' campaign ==
During 2008, a UK travel advertising campaign created by Out Now which used the term "So Gay" as an advertising slogan attracted global media attention.

The poster campaign featured six US destinations seeking to attract gay travelers from the UK. One poster saying "South Carolina is so gay" was criticized by a Republican State Senator and the office of South Carolina governor Mark Sanford, but was favorably received by members of the gay community.

The campaign was later described as "the year's most talked about tourism ads" by several media outlets, including AdWeek.
