= Gay-friendly =

Promoting a respectful environment for LGBTQ people

Gay-friendly or LGBTQ-friendly places, policies, people, or institutions are those that are open and welcoming to gay or LGBTQ people. They typically aim to create an environment that is supportive, respectful, and non-judgmental towards the LGBTQ community. The term "gay-friendly" originated in the late 20th century in North America as a byproduct of a gradual implementation of gay rights, greater acceptance of LGBTQ people in society, and the recognition of LGBTQ people as a distinct consumer group for businesses.

== Businesses ==
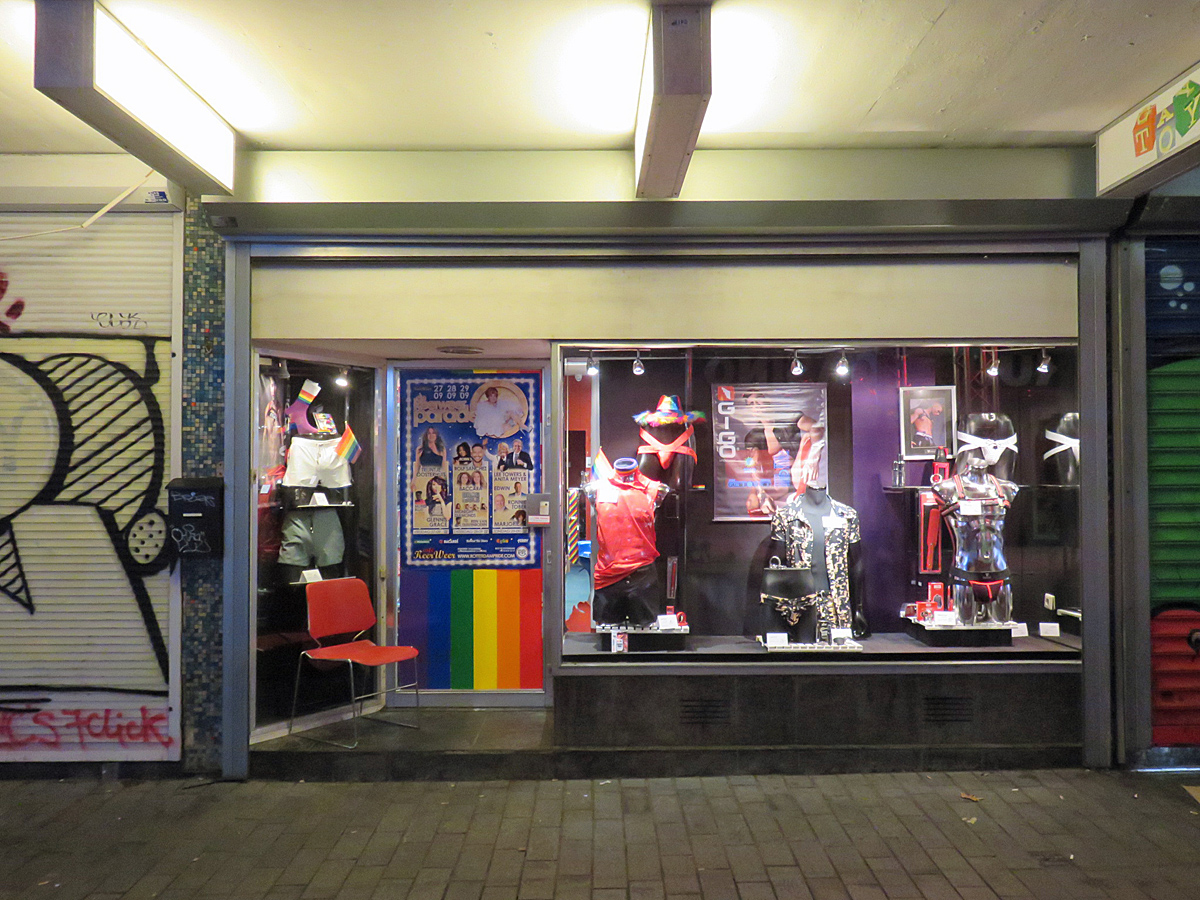
A shop in Amsterdam selling LGBTQ+ merchandise and goods

Many businesses now identify as gay-friendly, allowing for a more diversified employee and customer base. The Human Rights Campaign works to achieve equality for gays, lesbians, and other marginalized minorities, and publishes a list of companies in relation to issues concerning LGBT people. Companies that are noted for gay-friendly work environments include Dell and Coca-Cola. Companies such as R Family Vacations, Manspray, Volkswagen, Ginch Gonch, and numerous others offer niche products and services for gay customers. Others, such as LOT Polish Airlines sends the message of gay-friendliness by offering travel to major gay destinations with a rainbow flag. Studies have shown that LGBT communities tend to favor gay-friendly businesses, even if the cost of a particular product or service is higher.

== Religious groups ==
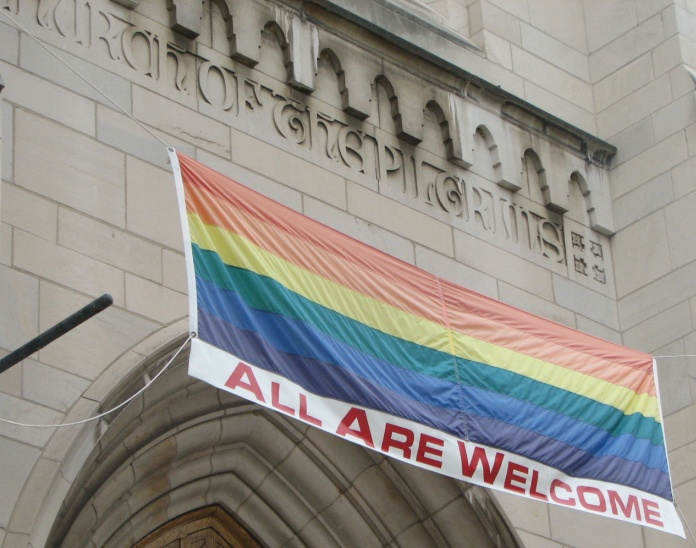
Portal of the Church of Pilgrims, in Washington, DC, USA, with an LGBT banner

Some Christian and Jewish religious denominations, as well as Christian churches and affirming Jewish synagogues, have LGBT-friendly programs.

== World ==
The Pew Research Center conducted a survey in 2019 to measure levels of acceptance of LGBTQ people around the globe.

Country-specific percentage of people who say homosexuality should be accepted by society
Rank	Country	Percent
1	Sweden	94%
2	Netherlands	92%
3	Spain	89%
4	Germany	86%
4	France	86%
4	UK	86%
7	Canada	85%
8	Australia	81%
9	Argentina	76%
10	Italy	75%

Researchers at the Williams Institute at UCLA released a report in 2021 after analyzing findings from different surveys to develop their own LGBTQ Global Acceptance Index (GAI).

Most gay-friendly countries
Rank	Country	GAI
1	Iceland	9.78
2	Netherlands	9.46
3	Norway	9.38
4	Sweden	9.18
5	Canada	9.02
6	Spain	8.77
7	Denmark	8.69
8	Ireland	8.41
9	Great Britain	8.34
10	New Zealand	8.23

=== Spartacus Gay Travel Index ===
The Spartacus International Gay Guide publishes the Gay Travel Index, a ranking of gay-friendly countries. Points are added to countries for anti-discrimination legislation, equal marriage, partnership and adoption laws, and LGBT marketing. Meanwhile, points are subtracted for anti-LGBT laws, HIV travel restrictions, religious influence; with prosecution, murders, and death sentences resulting in the largest deductions.

In 2026, the Spartacus Gay Travel Index featured mostly Western European countries in the top 10 spots, with Iceland claiming the top spot. The last place went to Yemen.

List of countries and regions by Gay Travel Index (2026)
Rank	Country/Region	Score	Change from last year
1	Iceland	14	▲1
2	Malta	13	Steady
2	Spain	13	Steady
4	Belgium	12	▲2
4	Canada	12	▼1
4	Germany	12	Steady
4	Portugal	12	▼1
8	New Zealand	11	▼1
8	Norway	11	Steady
8	Switzerland	11	Steady
11	Australia	10	▼1
11	Chile	10	Steady
11	France	10	▲2
11	Uruguay	10	▼1
15	Austria	9	Steady
15	Colombia	9	▲2
15	Cuba	9	▲3
15	Denmark	9	▼1
15	Faroe Islands	9	New entry
15	Finland	9	Steady
15	French Polynesia	9	▲1
15	Greece	9	Steady
15	Greenland	9	Steady
15	Luxembourg	9	Steady
15	Netherlands	9	Steady
15	New Caledonia	9	▲2
15	Sweden	9	Steady
28	Ireland	8	▼1
28	Réunion	8	Steady
28	Taiwan	8	▼1
31	India	7	▲4
32	Andorra	6	▼2
32	Argentina	6	▼3
32	Brazil	6	▼1
32	Gibraltar	6	▲3
32	Guadeloupe	6	Steady
32	Martinique	6	Steady
32	Mexico	6	▲1
32	Nepal	6	▲5
32	United Kingdom	6	▼3
41	Costa Rica	5	▼2
41	Ecuador	5	▲2
41	Estonia	5	▼2
41	Israel	5	Steady
41	Puerto Rico	5	▲1
41	Slovenia	5	▼1
47	Aruba	4	▲3
47	Bolivia	4	▲3
47	South Africa	4	Steady
47	United States	4	▲2
47	US Virgin Islands	4	▲3
52	Cyprus	3	▲1
52	Czech Republic	3	▲1
52	Guam	3	Steady
52	Thailand	3	▼1
56	Croatia	2	Steady
56	Liechtenstein	2	Steady
56	San Marino	2	▲1
59	Curaçao	-1	Steady
59	Italy	-1	Steady
59	Japan	-1	▲1
59	Latvia	-1	Steady
59	Lithuania	-1	▲2
59	Montenegro	-1	Steady
59	Poland	-1	▲6
59	Vietnam	-1	Steady
67	Bermuda	-2	▼1
67	Bosnia and Herzegovina	-2	▼1
67	South Korea	-2	Steady
67	Northern Cyprus	-2	▲1
67	Romania	-2	▲1
67	Sint Maarten	-2	▲1
67	Suriname	-2	▲2
74	Albania	-3	▼1
74	Antigua and Barbuda	-3	Steady
74	Barbados	-3	▲1
74	Bhutan	-3	▼2
74	Botswana	-3	▲1
74	British Virgin Islands	-3	▲2
74	Fiji	-3	Steady
74	Lesotho	-3	▲2
74	Monaco	-3	Steady
74	Namibia	-3	▼1
74	Serbia	-3	▼1
74	Singapore	-3	▼1
74	Ukraine	-3	▼1
87	Belize	-4	▼2
87	Cape Verde	-4	Steady
87	Cambodia	-4	Steady
87	Micronesia	-4	Steady
87	Moldova	-4	▲1
87	Mongolia	-4	▼1
87	North Macedonia	-4	▼1
87	Peru	-4	▼1
87	Seychelles	-4	▲1
87	Slovakia	-4	▼2
97	China (incl. Hong Kong)	-5	Steady
97	Timor-Leste	-5	Steady
97	Kosovo	-5	▼1
97	Macau	-5	▼1
97	Marshall Islands	-5	▼2
97	Mauritius	-5	Steady
97	Samoa	-5	Steady
104	Armenia	-6	▼1
104	Bulgaria	-6	Steady
104	Cook Islands	-6	▼1
104	Panama	-6	▼2
104	São Tomé and Príncipe	-6	Steady
104	Sri Lanka	-6	Steady
110	Angola	-7	▼4
110	El Salvador	-7	▼2
110	Guinea-Bissau	-7	▼1
110	Honduras	-7	Steady
110	Laos	-7	▼4
110	Mozambique	-7	▼3
110	Saint Kitts and Nevis	-7	Steady
110	Saint Lucia	-7	▼3
110	Venezuela	-7	▲1
119	Benin	-8	▼2
119	Kiribati	-8	▼1
119	Palau	-8	▼1
119	Philippines	-8	▼1
123	Dominican Republic	-9	▲2
123	Ethiopia	-9	▲5
123	Gabon	-9	▼1
123	Guinea	-9	Steady
123	Hungary	-9	▼4
123	Nicaragua	-9	▼1
123	Pakistan	-9	▼2
123	Tuvalu	-9	▼1
123	Vanuatu	-9	▼3
132	Bahamas	-10	Steady
132	Bahrain	-10	Steady
132	Bangladesh	-10	Steady
132	Belarus	-10	▲2
132	Central African Republic	-10	Steady
132	Equatorial Guinea	-10	Steady
132	Eswatini	-10	▲2
132	Grenada	-10	▼2
132	Guatemala	-10	▼1
132	Haiti	-10	Steady
132	Ivory Coast	-10	▲2
132	Kazakhstan	-10	▼1
132	North Korea	-10	▲1
132	Lebanon	-10	▼2
132	Paraguay	-10	▼2
132	Rwanda	-10	Steady
132	Solomon Islands	-10	▲1
132	Tonga	-10	▼1
132	Trinidad & Tobago	-10	▼3
132	Vatican City	-10	▼2
152	Chad	-11	Steady
152	Comoros	-11	▼1
152	Democratic Republic of the Congo	-11	Steady
152	Dominica	-11	▼1
152	Gambia	-11	Steady
152	Guyana	-11	▼1
152	Jamaica	-11	▲1
152	Madagascar	-11	Steady
152	Niger	-11	▼6
152	Republic of the Congo	-11	▼1
152	Saint Vincent and the Grenadines	-11	▼1
152	Sierra Leone	-11	▼2
152	Tajikistan	-11	▼2
152	Togo	-11	▼1
152	Turkey	-11	▼1
152	Uzbekistan	-11	Steady
168	Georgia	-12	▼1
168	Ghana	-12	Steady
168	Indonesia	-12	▲1
168	Kenya	-12	▼2
168	Kyrgyzstan	-12	▼5
168	Liberia	-12	▼1
168	Maldives	-12	▼1
168	Myanmar	-12	▼2
176	Azerbaijan	-13	▼6
176	Burundi	-13	▼3
176	Djibouti	-13	▼2
176	Malawi	-13	▲1
176	Mauritania	-13	▼1
176	Papua New Guinea	-13	▼3
176	Zambia	-13	▼1
183	Algeria	-14	▼1
183	Burkina Faso	-14	▼6
183	Cameroon	-14	▲1
183	Eritrea	-14	▼1
183	Mali	-14	▼6
183	Morocco	-14	Steady
183	Tunisia	-14	Steady
190	Brunei	-15	▼1
190	Aceh (Indonesia)	-15	▼1
190	Jordan	-15	▼3
190	Oman	-15	▼3
190	Syria	-15	▼2
195	Egypt	-16	▼2
195	Kuwait	-16	Steady
195	Libya	-16	Steady
195	Malaysia	-16	▼1
195	Senegal	-16	▼3
195	Sudan	-16	▼4
195	Zimbabwe	-16	▼2
202	Nigeria	-17	Steady
202	Qatar	-17	Steady
202	Russia	-17	Steady
202	South Sudan	-17	▼3
202	Tanzania	-17	▼2
202	Turkmenistan	-17	▼3
208	Iraq	-18	▼3
208	United Arab Emirates	-18	▼2
210	Uganda	-19	▼1
211	Somalia	-21	▼2
212	Afghanistan	-22	Steady
212	Chechnya (Russia)	-22	▼1
212	Saudi Arabia	-22	Steady
215	Iran	-23	▼1
216	Yemen	-24	▼1

=== Not Included in Data ===
- Abkhazia
- American Samoa
- Mayotte
- Nauru
- Niue
- Northern Mariana Islands
- Palestine
- Somaliland
- South Ossetia
- Transnistria
- Wallis and Futuna
- Western Sahara

== United States ==
Spartacus also publishes a Gay Travel Index for U.S. states, listing the 50 states plus the District of Columbia with the same criteria as the country rankings.

In 2026, the top spot went to New York while Arkansas, Oklahoma and Tennessee were the worst-ranked states for LGBT people.

List of U.S. states by Gay Travel Index (2026)
Rank	Country/Region	Score	Change from last year
1	New York	16	▲1
2	California	14	Steady
2	Nevada	14	▲1
2	Washington	14	▲1
5	Colorado	13	▲1
5	New Jersey	13	▲1
5	New Mexico	13	▲2
5	Oregon	13	Steady
9	Maine	12	▲3
9	Massachusetts	12	▲1
9	Minnesota	12	▲3
9	Vermont	12	▲3
9	Washington, D.C.	12	Steady
14	Hawaii	11	▲1
14	Illinois	11	Steady
14	Maryland	11	▲1
14	Michigan	11	▲3
14	Rhode Island	11	▲3
14	Virginia	11	▲1
20	Connecticut	10	Steady
20	Delaware	10	▲8
22	Utah	8	Steady
23	New Hampshire	6	▼1
23	Pennsylvania	6	Steady
25	Arizona	5	Steady
26	Wisconsin	3	▲1
27	Georgia	2	Steady
28	Alaska	1	▲1
29	Kentucky	0	Steady
30	Kansas	-1	▲1
30	Louisiana	-1	Steady
30	North Carolina	-1	▲1
30	Ohio	-1	▼5
34	Indiana	-2	▼1
34	Iowa	-2	▼1
34	Missouri	-2	▼2
34	Montana	-2	▲3
34	Nebraska	-2	▼1
34	South Dakota	-2	▲1
40	Alabama	-3	▲1
40	Florida	-3	▼2
40	North Dakota	-3	▼1
40	Texas	-3	▼2
40	Wyoming	-3	Steady
45	Idaho	-4	▼4
45	Mississippi	-4	▼1
45	South Carolina	-4	Steady
45	West Virginia	-4	▼1
49	Arkansas	-5	▼1
49	Oklahoma	-5	▲1
49	Tennessee	-5	▼2

== See also ==
- Anti-gay
- Homosocialization
- LGBTQ marketing
- Pinkwashing (LGBTQ)
- Pink capitalism
