= Commercial Closet Association =

US nonprofit organization

- Commercial Closet Association Logo
- Abbreviation: CCA
- Merged into: GLAAD
- Formation: 2001; 25 years ago
- Founder: Michael Wilke
- Dissolved: May 7, 2008; 18 years ago
- Type: Non-profit organization
- Purpose: Education on LGBTQ+ representation in advertising and media
- Location: New York City

The Commercial Closet Association (CCA) was a New York City based non-profit organization, founded in 2001 to provide "training and best practices on the representations of" the lesbian, gay, bisexual and transgender (LGBTQ+) community in advertising. It hoped to affect the $1.1 trillion annual worldwide advertising market ($128 billion in the US alone). Its board announced its closure in 2009 after merging with the Gay & Lesbian Alliance Against Defamation (GLAAD).

The Association's programs targeted at the business and advertising industries included advertising training, an online Ad Library, Best Practices guidelines, a monthly LGBTQ+ advertising issues column, and the annual Images in Advertising Awards event to honor excellence of LGBTQ+ portrayals in advertising.

The organization targeted marketing and ad agency corporate officers and executives, university students/professors, the media, and consumers, aiming to make future advertising more inclusive and positive by contacting advertising and image creators in order to educate them directly.

== Programs ==
The CCA stated it was not pressure group or advertising watchdog, instead aiming to educate advertisers. Its programs focused on raising industry awareness of the issues of LGBTQ+ stereotypes, homophobia and transphobia in mainstream advertising; some of its efforts were created in conjunction with the Association of National Advertisers, the American Association of Advertising Agencies, New York politicians like Thomas Duane, and major advertising agency executives. After the merger, GLAAD received the Ad Library, training resources, online materials, and the company's name.

The CCA Ad Library is an online collection of over 4,000 LGBTQ+-themed ads from over 33 countries and hundreds of companies and ad agencies since 1917. It contained "video clips, still photo storyboards, descriptive critiques, and indexing to more than 600 television and print media ad representations," sortable by various statistics and also by overall depiction or message about gayness, "categorized as vague, neutral, positive, or negative." The site includes ratings, consumer feedback, Advertising Best Practices, and other resources.

The Best Practices guidelines outlined how to create respectful ad representations of LGBTQ+ people to be used as part of advertising training.

Each year, the organization seeded 40-50 press stories and conducted worldwide advertising tracking and analysis of LGBTQ+ representations, complete with ratings and visitor feedback.

The CCA published original data reports on LGBTQ+ sponsorship spending, top spending companies, and top earning LGBTQ+ organizations and events.

== History ==
The Commercial Closet Association was founded in 2001 "as a way to track and document [LGBTQ+ themed advertisements." It developed out of work by Advertising Age magazine business journalist Michael Wilke, who was known for his work in writing about gay and lesbian matters in advertising. He had created a video program in 1997 called "The Commercial Closet", which was presented at film festivals internationally, and in 2001, Wilke was funded by broadcast historian Michael Collins, then of Quinnipiac College of Connecticut, to start a full nonprofit organization by the same name. The project received pro-bono work from web development firm Mediapolis and designer Stephen Mack of Gnomist to develop the first version of CCA's online advertising library and ad ratings system at CommercialCloset.org. In 2004, the name evolved to Commercial Closet Association to indicate that it was an organization and to distinguish it from the educational programs it produced.

Wilke had written about LGBTQ+ issues with Inside Media, Advertising Age (Crain Communications), Adweek (Nielsen Company), and other publications since 1992. He is credited with coining the term "gay vague" in 1997 while at Advertising Age. He served as the New York chapter president of the National Lesbian and Gay Journalists Association from 1998–2000, received a 1998 honor at the GLAAD Media Awards for his journalism on LGBT in related industries, was honored in 2001 as one of the "OUT 100" by Out magazine, and was a 2002 Crain Lecturer at the Medill School of Journalism at Northwestern University. He was a judge for the 2006 Association of National Advertisers Multicultural Excellence Awards. He writes a syndicated national column, The Commercial Closet, for LGBTQ+ newspapers and web sites.

The CCA began its Images in Advertising Awards in 2004, running until at least 2008.

In 2009, the Commercial Closet Associate's board of directors announced its closure and merger with GLAAD.

In December 2012, the Commercial Closet website was to be shut down by GLAAD but Wilke intervened and relaunched the project under the new name AdRespect.

== Partnerships and sponsors ==
CCA is supported through foundation grants, corporate sponsorships, fundraising events, membership, individual donations, and training fees.

CCA has or had partnerships with advertising and media industry groups and with the LGBTQ+ organizations in the United States. Ad industry groups included the Association of National Advertisers and the Advertising Educational Foundation. Media included The New York Times, Sirius Satellite Radio, and Adweek. Gay community groups include the Human Rights Campaign, the Gay Lesbian Straight Education Network (GLSEN), and also GLAAD, pre-merger.

GLSEN carried a Student Viewing Guide for teachers, and Human Rights Campaign carried the CCA's monthly LGBTQ+ advertising issues column, the Advertising Best Practices, and excerpts from Commercial Closet in the marketing section of WorkNet.

The Images in Advertising Awards were sponsored by ad agencies including Lowe Worldwide, Arnold Worldwide, Interpublic Group, SSH+K, and others.

== See also ==
- LGBTQ portrayals in mass media
