= Iranian Law and Legal Research Institute =

Iranian academic institute

- پژوهشکده حقوق و قانون ایران
- Type: Private sector
- Established: 2010
- Founder: 4 real people
- Chairperson: Mohammad Darvishzadeh
- Location: Tehran, Iran; 35°41′57.6″N 51°23′43.4″E
- Website: Official website

The Iranian Law and Legal Research Institute (Persian: پژوهشکده حقوق و قانون ایران), formerly Allameh Legal Encyclopedia Research Center (Persian: مرکز پژوهشی دانشنامه‌های حقوقی علامه), is a scientific and juridical research institute, composed of four groups: encyclopedia writing, legal theorization and intellectualism, studies on social impact of laws, and studies on "extra" laws. Operating under the license of the Ministry of Science, Research and Technology of Iran, this research institute is one of the first legal entities to be recognized as a knowledge-based company by the Vice-Presidency for Science and Technology of Iran.

The institute conducts legal research on Iranian jurisprudence and contributed to the revision of the nation's civil registration law. Its activities include analyzing draft legislation, regulations, and bylaws, as well as establishing a standardized framework for drafting legal encyclopedias across more than 60 subfields.

== Short History ==
A group of people who have a background in judicial and managership work founded the Iranian Law & Legal Research Institute in 2010 under Judiciary Vice President for Education and Research for Judiciary, focusing on the collection and management of peripheral legal knowledge. The Development Council of the Ministry of Science, Research, and Technology received the approval in principle in 2015 and the approval for converting it to the Allameh Legal Encyclopedia Research Institute in 2019. After the establishment and consolidation period of the institute passed, its development period began in 2020. The center was authorized to update from a research center to a research institute by the Ministry of Science, Research and Technology. These amendments were reported by the Official Gazette in January 2020.

The research activities have been focused on three research groups, "Legal Studies," "Criminal studies," and the "Legal Studies" research center, before being promoted to Research Institute. But the Ministry of Science, Research and Techno agreed to increase the number and change the research groups in the Institute at the same time as these changes.

With its research record conducted in 2020, the Iranian Law and Legal Investigation Institute was one of the first scientific centers to have received the Vice President of the Science and Technology title of knowledge-based enterprise.

== Goals ==
Under both headings of "macro-goals" and "micro-goals," the center has defined its objectives. This research institute's macro goals include the development, expansion and stage setting of legal research activities. The research institute is also focused on the fundamental principles of legal and legal works and contents and on the correspondence between legal teaching and legal precedents as well as legislation and on the compilation and publication of encyclopedias in different areas of law.

== Structure and organization ==
An administrative board headed by the research institute shall govern the Iranian Law and Legal Research Institute. The management body comprises the Research Board, the Vice Presidency of Research, the Vice Presidency of Sustainability and Technology, the Inspector, the advisory committee and Public Relations. Several scientific groups at this research institute, including a group leader, are members of the faculty and researchers.

Art. 7 of the Memorandum of Association of the Institute of Legal and Law of Iran covers the tasks and competencies of this institute. Therefore, this Research Institute has the duties and powers to assess, plan and implement legal research on three levels: fundamental, applied, and development, as well as to cooperate in research with domestic and foreign universities. The research institute can also provide consulting services based on research results. This research institute has also been responsible for establishing educational and research (including books, journals, etc.) and conducting science conferences, short-term courses and workshops.

=== Research groups ===
The research groups of this research institute are:

- Encyclopedia writing
- Legal theorizing and intellectualism
- Studies of the social impact of laws
- Law of disciplines

=== Affiliate research journals ===
To create and disseminate technical information in different fields of jurisprudence, the Research Centre designed and published various journals. Legal World (Persian: روزنامه دنیای حقوق), for example, was one of Iran's first legal research and information journals. This newspaper published its first edition on August 13, 2014. The Legal World newspaper appeared in twelve pages a few days and sixteen pages a few days later. The journal pages include Law News and Law News, Law and Society News and law of disciplines.

In September 2016, the Press Supervisory Board licensed Quarterly of Legal Encyclopedias (formerly the Legal Science Quarterly). Among this Quarterly's objectives are to improve the quality of country legal research, expand legal knowledge borders, and the practical scope of legal research. This quarterly scope of activities is within fifteen areas of interest and of legal interest, including civil law, civil liability law, IPR, pathological law, etc.

Another publication of this research institute, which received publishing authorization from the Press Supervisory Board in September 2011, is Biweekly of Law and legal information courier.

== Activities ==
There have been numerous activities and achievements by the Iranian Law and Legal Research Institute to this day. These include 15 volumes of jurisprudential documentaries on civil law, a compilation of legal terms of 106288 words, translations of the Tahreero Al-Majalleh five-volume collection, and numerous bibliographies and sources of information. The center has also carried out demand-based investigations for Iran's judicial system, the Ministry of Justice of Iran, the NCRO, the National Iranian Oil Company, etc.

Some of the research institutes' most important scientific activities are:

=== Legal knowledge management ===
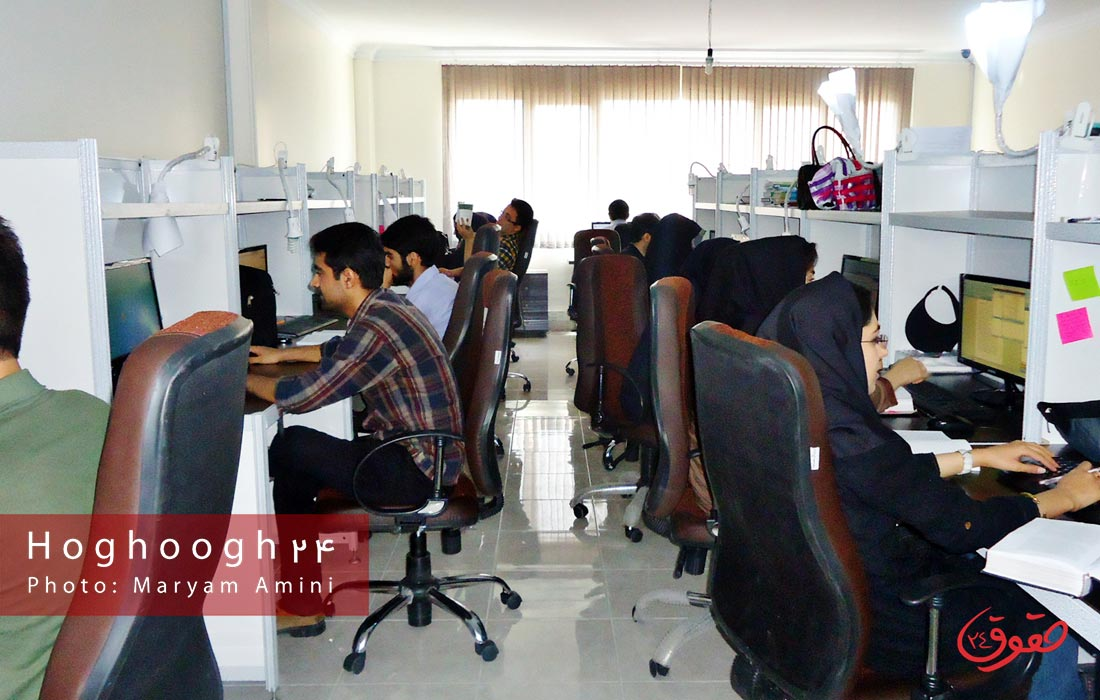
Researchers at the Iranian Law and Legal Research Institute are taking digital note-taking

One of the activities of this research institute is the peripheral knowledge management project. The project identified, collected, and organized peripheral knowledge of legal materials in collaboration with about 200 researchers who are judges, lawyers, faculty members, graduates, and law students. Currently, an average of over 119 notes for every 10,000 legal documents to be researched was prepared, for a total of 2,000,000 notes. This research institute is committed to continuing this research using Artificial intelligence technology. The process of note-taking is through proprietary software. Consequently, this note-taking is performed digitally.

=== Amendment of Iran's Civil Registration Law ===
At the National Organization for Civil Registration of Iran is request, a bill was drafted to amend the Civil Registration Law sections. This bill was drawn up after a long period of research. The project was submitted. The bill proposed for a project was drawn up based on "Civilian Registry Evaluation" and "Civilian Registration Law Amending and Review" research projects in 62 sections, 37 notes and 78 X and is currently being prepared in the hands of the committee with over 12 sub-projects for evaluation of the necessities. They are the cabinet bills.

=== Classification of legal encyclopedias ===
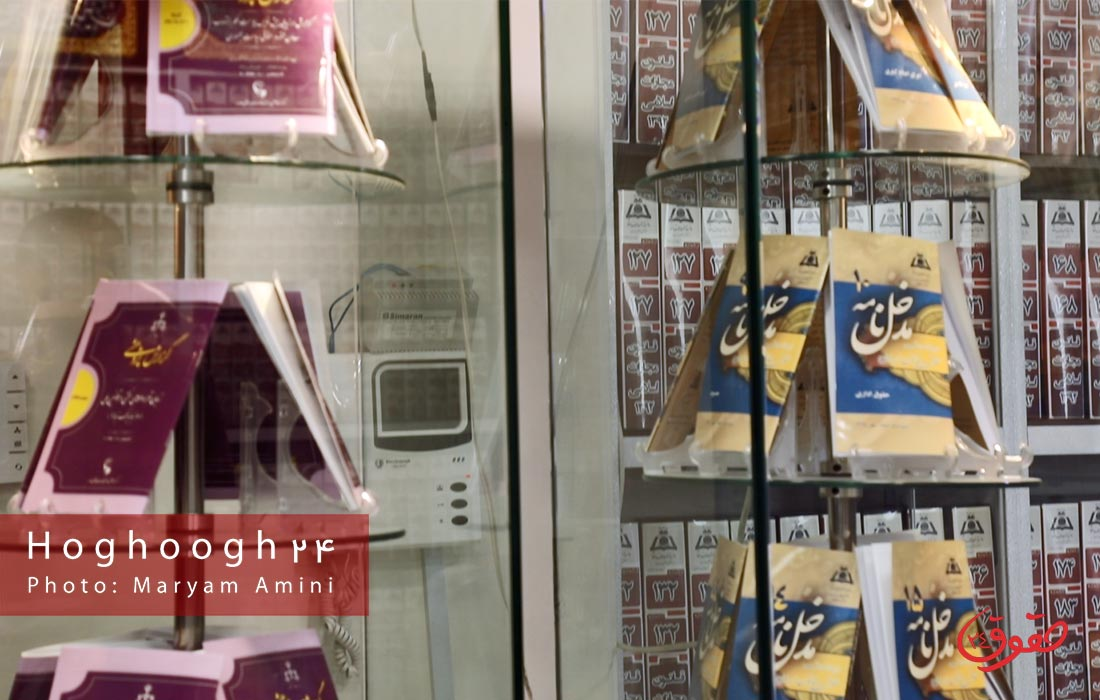
Entrances prepared by the Iranian Law and Legal Research Institute

Another activity of this research institute is the compilation of legal encyclopedias for 66 legal specialties. A feasible study and needs assessment was carried out first for this purpose. The research then started with the assumption that "every area of study with a history of the definition of more than ÷0 specific subjects in special works will require that a specialist encyclopedia is developed as an independent area of law research." This study resulted in the identification of more than 110,000 entries in the field of different legal studies. The result was that 63 volumes would then be arranged for entry into each of the legal areas. law of disciplines such as water law, electricity law, green energy legislation, cultural heritage legislation, tourism and road law, the national law of the case history, nutrition legislation and agricultural law have also emerged. as a consequence of this investigation. The Iranian Institute of Law and Legal Research. initially established and developed encyclopedia writing. Encyclopedia writing studies are covered by 66 subjects covering core law, media, journalists, national law, special contracts, civil law and criminal law.

=== Research infrastructure in Iranian law ===
"one-to-one correspondence" between "Iranian law sources" is a study carried out in 2011–2016 in this research institute by hundreds of researchers from different legal branches. In other words, mother law has been defined as the subject and research scope in Iranian law by this research institute. A collection of books, papers, and dissertations from the past century has been considered legal teaching and legal precedents. The research is aimed at developing the largest research infrastructure in Iranian law based on line-by-line reading and content analysis of Iranian law sources (law, judicial precedent, and legal doctrine). The research is being updated constantly.

=== Evaluating draft legislation ===
The research institute has many times assessed and analyzed draft bills, guidelines and bylaws. For example, an executive review report on the amendment of the Anti-Money Laundering Law to ensure internal consistency and compliance with legal guidelines, an analysis and assessment report on draft guidelines on public rights monitoring and pursuit and an evaluation report on the draft m bill were included.

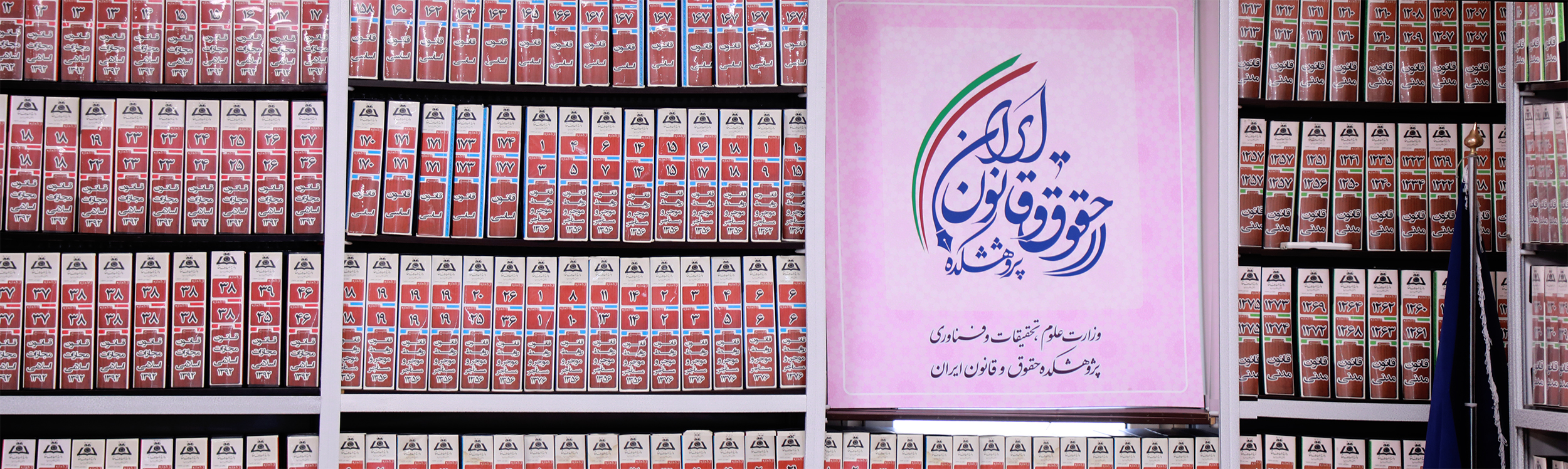
View of the reservoirs dedicated to the Research sheets of legal materials in the Iranian Law and Legal Research Institute

=== Holding national conferences ===
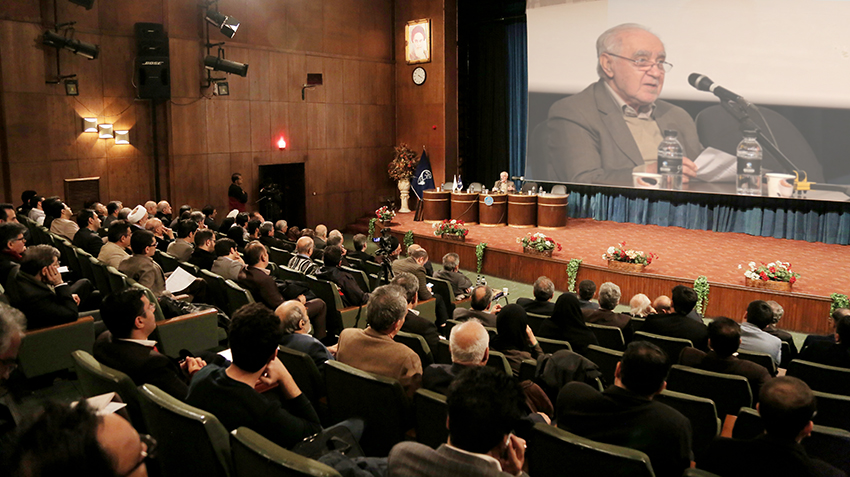
A picture of one of the national conferences held by Iranian Law and Legal Research Institute .

The Iranian Law and Legal Research Institute for Fundamental Legal Studies have organized several conferences in Iran with the involvement of the country's Universities and Scientific Legal Associations.
