= Jahero =

Video blog by Rosie O'Donnell

JaHeRo
- (left to right Rosie O'Donnell, Janette Barber, and Helene Macaulay answer viewers questions in a live vlog of Jahero)
- Creators: Rosie O'Donnell; Janette Barber; Helene Macaulay
- Website: www.rosie.com/blog/sections/jahero
- Launched: 2007; 19 years ago

JaHeRo is the video blog (vlog) started by Rosie O'Donnell on her website Rosie.com answering fans questions, giving behind the scenes information and serving as a video diary. Originally featuring only O'Donnell and her hair and make-up artist Helene Macaulay they were soon joined by her writer from The Rosie O'Donnell Show, Janette Barber. O'Donnell, her producer Barber, and Macaulay created unscripted video blogs Monday through Thursday prior to taping, during which they answered user-submitted questions. Called Jahero, composed of the first two letters of each of their first names, they occasionally had short cameo appearances by View co-hosts Joy Behar, Elisabeth Hasselbeck, and Barbara Walters. Jenny McCarthy appeared once briefly, as has Hasselbeck's mother-in-law and O'Donnell's mother-in-law, her wife Kelli's mother. Kathy Griffin also appeared, where she read some of the questions. It became so popular that O'Donnell and her creative team considered an "on the road" version of the video blog utilizing fan-submitted suggestions. O'Donnell was the front runner for the "best celebrity blogger" category in the 2007 Blogger's Choice Awards which she won.

They adopted Bonnie Tyler's "Holding Out for a Hero" as their unofficial theme song with O'Donnell quite frequently singing the chorus as "I Need JAHERO" after it was suggested by a blogger on Rosie's site.

The New York Times' television critic and journalist Virginia Heffernan praised O'Donnell for being able to be "so watchable" even though she has "no commercials, no scripts, no music, no wardrobe, no crew."

[T]he videos are pure Rosie, in the sense that with their unforgiving lighting and absent production values Ms. O'Donnell, the comic-actress-host, is revealing the last of whatever she was holding back on daytime television. The spectacle of her both humbled and emboldened ... without bronzer to contour her face or concealer to hide her fatigue, or directors to keep her coloring within the political and professional lines. And, man, is this girl good on screen. [She] seems to be experimenting with an emo style, the morose deadpan known to YouTubers but anathema to TV and stage veterans like herself. But the Rosie-unplugged thing works.

— Virginia Heffernan, "Really, Really Rosie", The New York Times, June 21, 2007

== History ==
The video blog debuted on March 27, 2007 in the makeup/dressing room of The View at ABC Studios New York. Originally featuring only O'Donnell and Macaulay, on April 18, 2007 Barber joined the cast. Occasionally Joy Behar, Elisabeth Hasselbeck, and Barbara Walters made short cameo appearances. Jenny McCarthy appeared once briefly, as did Hasselbeck's mother-in-law and O'Donnell's mother-in-law (wife Kelli's mother). Kathy Griffin also appeared, during which she read some of the user-submitted questions.

Rosie left the View on May 25, 2007. JaHeRo reunited to create blogs twice at Rosie's home during the summer of 2007.

In January 2008, Rosie confirmed on her blog that she will re-unite with Helene for some blog videos when she tapes her appearances for "Password," hosted by Regis Philbin. Rosie also said Janette will not be present.

== Cast ==
=== Janette Barber ===
Janette Barber ("JA" in "JAhero") and O'Donnell have been friends for 20+ years. Janette was a former writer for The Rosie O'Donnell Show. The two met doing stand up in the 1980s. She often shares unique stories about her life such as her dad burying a can of peas in the ground then replacing them with raisins. She met her partner, Barry, on the Internet when she was working on O'Donnell's show. Barber enjoys alternative rock, gardening and boxing. Barber was allegedly escorted from ABC building during the week of May 21, 2007 for drawing a moustache on a magazine picture of Elisabeth Hasselbeck that was posted on a bulletin board. Rosie explains the incident in the Jahero (Minus Janette) blog posted on 5/26.

=== Helene Macaulay ===
Helene Macaulay ("HE" in "JaHEro") is O'Donnell's hair stylist and makeup artist. She is often seen eating unusual foods such as dark chocolate, salmon, cold pizza, and large turkey legs for breakfast on the blog. She says her eyes are puffy in the morning so to mask them she usually wears retro aviator sunglasses on the blog. Macaulay is an advocate for environmentally friendly materials and habits and was found to reuse makeup sponges. She watches little-to-no television and also takes several classes, including: French, speech, and singing. Helene is also an actor, writer, director and producer for film and theater. She and her brother Gavin Macaulay co-directed and produced two documentaries, "Frankie's Mambo: El Ritmo Diablo" and "Chema's House", both of which aired on PBS. Helene's other celebrity clients include Edie Falco and Mariah Carey

=== Rosie O'Donnell ===
Rosie O'Donnell ("RO" in "JaheRO") is an American comedian, actress, singer, author and media personality. She has also been a magazine editor and continues to be a celebrity blogger, LGBT rights activist, television producer and collaborative partner in the LGBT family vacation company R Family Vacations. Raised Roman Catholic, O'Donnell lost her mother to cancer as a pre-teen and has stressed the importance of protecting children and supporting families throughout her career. O'Donnell started her comedy career while still a teenager and her big break was on the talent show Star Search when she was twenty years old. A TV sitcom and a series of movies introduced her to a larger national audience and in 1996 she started hosting The Rosie O'Donnell Show which won multiple Emmy awards.

During her years on The Rosie O'Donnell Show she wrote her first book, a memoir called Find Me and developed the nickname "Queen Of Nice" as well as a reputation for philanthropic efforts. She used the book's $3 million advance to establish her own For All Kids foundation and promoted other charity projects encouraging other celebrities on her show to also take part. O'Donnell came out stating "I'm a dyke!" two months before finishing her talk show run, saying that her primary reason was to bring attention to gay adoption issues. O'Donnell is a foster—and adoptive—mother. She has since continued to support many LGBT causes and issues. In 2006 O'Donnell became the new moderator on The View boosting ratings and attracting controversies with her liberal views, and strong personality, dominating many of the conversations. She became a polarizing figure to many and her strong opinions resulted in several notable controversies including an on-air dispute regarding the Bush administration's policies with the war in Iraq resulting in a mutual agreement to cancel her contract. In 2007 O'Donnell also released her second memoir, Celebrity Detox, which focuses on her struggles with fame and her time at The View. She continues to do charity work and remains involved with LGBT and family-related issues. In 2008 O'Donnell starred in and executive produced America, a Lifetime channel original movie in which she plays the therapist of the title character, a 16-year-old boy aging out of the foster care system. The film is based on the E.R. Frank book of the same name.

In November 2009 "Rosie Radio", a daily two-hour show with O'Donnell discussing news and events on Sirius XM Radio, premiered. O'Donnell said she was approached by the company after she appeared on The Howard Stern Show. O'Donnell has signed on with the Oprah Winfrey Network OWN to return to daytime TV with a talk show in Fall 2011.
