= Janette Barber =

American comedian and producer

- Born: September 25, 1953 (age 73)
- Employer(s): Rosie O'Donnell, Molly McButter
- Known for: comic, television producer, writer, spokesperson

Janette Barber (born September 25, 1953) is an American comic, television producer, and writer. She has won six Emmy Awards, including five that she shares with the writers and producers of The Rosie O'Donnell Show. After that show ended, Barber continued to work with O'Donnell on The View and on O'Donnell's blog "JaHeRo". Barber is also known for her recovery from chronic pain, and her story was reported on 20/20, Larry King Live and elsewhere. In addition, Barber acts as the food expert and spokesperson for Molly McButter.

== Career ==
At The Rosie O'Donnell Show, Barber was the supervising producer and head writer. She shared five Emmy Awards with the producers of the show. Following that she was executive producer and co-host of Lighten Up!, a series she created for the Food Network. Barber won her sixth Emmy Award for writing on The View. She currently works with the on-air team for Rosie's XM Radio Show.

In late 2010, Rosie O'Donnell announced she would be leaving radio to go back to television. Many wondered what would become of Janette Barber and the other people from Rosie's radio show. On May 19, 2011, Barber announced on her Facebook page that, after a massive write in campaign, she would be starring in "Janette's Show," the replacement to the defunct Rosie show.

Barber also has 12 years of stand up comedy experience. She was a nationally touring headliner who made regular appearances on many of the cable comedy shows, such as Showtime Comedy Club Network, VH1 Stand Up Spotlight, and A&E's Comedy on the Road.

In addition, Barber is a best selling author. She is the co-author, along with Laura Banks, of the humorous work titled Breaking the Rules, Last Ditch Tactics for Landing the Man of your Dreams (Career Press Publishers). Her latest book with Banks, Embracing Your Big Fat Ass, was released in June 2008 by Atria, a division of Simon & Schuster.

Barber is also the food expert and spokesperson for Molly McButter, a non-fat butter-flavored seasoning.

== The blog ==
In March 2007, Rosie O'Donnell began creating video blogs for her website. She made the video blogs while getting her hair and makeup done by Helene Macaulay in preparation for going on-air for the television show The View. As viewers began submitting questions directed towards or about Macaulay, she became a regular contributor to O'Donnell's video blog. Barber, who acts as O'Donnell's producer, would show up in the video occasionally to speak with O'Donnell. Within a few weeks, people were directing questions and comments towards Barber as well, and she also became a regular contributor to the video blog. The trio are collectively referred to as Jahero.

In May 2008, Barber started her own video and written blogs on her website www.janettesblog.com and at "Janette Barber Maximized" at MaxMouth.com.

== Last day at The View ==
Barber was Hot Topics Writer of The View and was in the ABC studios on the day Rosie O'Donnell and Elisabeth Hasselbeck had a significant fight that caused O'Donnell to leave the show three weeks earlier than her one-year contract specified. Barber, a close friend of O'Donnell, drew a moustache on a magazine tear sheet of Elisabeth Hasselbeck that was tacked up in The View offices. It was mistakenly reported by the New York Post and TV media outlets that Barber was escorted out of the building.

== Chronic pain ==
Barber is also well known for her dramatic improvement from chronic pain. Barber said that she suffered from back pain, and later ankle pain diagnosed as tendinitis. She said that the severity of the pain eventually prevented her from walking, so she used a wheelchair instead. After a segment about Barber's pain on The Rosie O'Donnell Show, many viewers wrote in with suggestions. As a result, Barber saw the controversial Dr. John E. Sarno, who diagnosed her as having tension myositis syndrome (TMS). Barber said that, after treatment for TMS, she was able to walk and run again. Barber's story was covered by 20/20 and Larry King Live.

== Humanitarian aid ==
After her chronic pain improved, Barber began doing volunteer work on behalf of AmeriCares, a disaster relief and humanitarian aid agency. Between 1999 and 2001, she participated in three airlifts to Albania, Kosovo and the Republic of the Congo. Barber produced segments for The Rosie O'Donnell Show about these airlifts.

Barber now sits on the board of directors of The Bridge Foundation.

In March 2009, Barber traveled to Rwanda with the Massachusetts-based relief group Medical Missions for Children. She serves as Ambassador at Large for the group and is producing video content to promote the mission.
