= All Aboard! Rosie's Family Cruise =

2006 television film

- Genre: Documentary
- Directed by: Shari Cookson
- Starring: Pam Elliott; Rosie O'Donnell; Kelli O'Donnell; Esera Tuaolo; Judy Gold; Megan Jacoby; Jane Skorina
- Country of origin: United States
- Original language: English

Production
- Producers: Shari Cookson; John Hoffman
- Cinematography: Maryse Alberti; Sandra Chandler; Beth Wichterich
- Editor: Charlton McMillan
- Running time: 91 minutes
- Production companies: Sceneworks; KidRo Productions; HBO

Original release
- Network: HBO
- Release: April 6, 2006

All Aboard! Rosie's Family Cruise is a 2006 American made-for-television documentary film that follows Rosie O'Donnell and her family along with several other families on the first-ever cruise designed for gay parents and their families. It was arranged and planned by Rosie O'Donnell and her life partner Kelli O'Donnell. The cruise ship set sail on July 11, 2004, and the film debuted on April 6, 2006, on HBO. The film was released on DVD-Video on June 13, 2006. The film went on to be nominated for three Emmy Awards.

== Synopsis ==
The film follows the maiden voyage of R Family Vacations, the travel company founded by Rosie and Kelli O'Donnell which specializes in gay family vacations. The cruise starts in New York City on July 11, 2004, and sails along the U.S. East Coast, stopping in Key West, Florida, and then in Nassau, Bahamas. Five hundred families attended the cruise, including LGBT parents as well as non-LGBT people. In the film, Rosie and Kelli's family, along with several other families on the cruise are interviewed, including former Hawaiian NFL star Esera Tuaolo along with his partner and their children. Comedian Judy Gold also makes appearances.

When the ship stops in the Bahamas, the cruise members are met with protests from some local Christians, though interviews show that there were many locals who did not have a problem with LGBT people and did not agree with the action of the protesters. Despite the protests, the trip continued as normal to the end.
