= Philip Johnson (actor) =

American actor (born 1991)

- Born: Philip Mark Johnson; July 28, 1991 (age 35); Detroit, Michigan, U.S.
- Education: University of Michigan
- Occupation: Actor
- Years active: 2009–present
- Parent(s): Gwen and Mark Johnson

Philip Mark Johnson (born July 28, 1991 in Detroit, Michigan) is an American actor. A 2009 honors graduate of Cass Technical High School, Johnson currently attends the University of Michigan. He played the title character in the 2009 Lifetime Television film America, based on the book America by E.R. Frank. Acting opposite Rosie O'Donnell and Ruby Dee, Johnson portrayed a troubled teenager placed in a youth treatment facility after attempting suicide who struggled to work through his traumatic past experiences with foster care and sexual abuse.

America was Johnson's first film. His previous acting experience was limited to one middle school play. Johnson was discovered by two of the executive producers of America, Rosie O'Donnell and Larry Santisky, at a Detroit coffee shop called Small Plates. O'Donnell, who was in town to work on America, told Entertainment Tonight that she sensed "a soulful kind of stillness" in Johnson. O'Donnell's casting crew had seen almost 200 children for the role, but was still undecided, because the boy needed to be "vulnerable, fragile, wounded, broken and non-presentational". Johnson fitted the bill perfectly. O'Donnell invited Johnson to audition for the lead role the next day. Johnson impressed the cast and crew with his spot-on reading and was given the role.

In the movie, Johnson's younger brother, Steven Johnson, played the same character at age 10.

== Accolades ==
On February 26, 2010, Johnson and his parents attended the 41st NAACP Image Awards, where he was nominated for a 2010 NAACP Image Award for Outstanding Actor in a Television Movie, Mini-Series, or Dramatic Special. He lost to the Academy Award winning actor, Cuba Gooding, Jr, for his work in Gifted Hands.

== Personal ==
Johnson graduated with honors in June 2009 from Cass Technical High School. Having been recruited by several Ivy League colleges including Harvard and Northwestern, he chose to attend the University of Michigan. In interviews, Johnson said that he was planning to major in engineering, but was now considering a career in acting.
