= America (novel) =

2002 young adult novel written by E. R. Frank

- Author: E. R. Frank
- Cover artist: Michael Yuen
- Language: English
- Genre: Young adult fiction
- Publisher: Simon & Schuster
- Publication date: 2002
- Publication place: United States
- Media type: Print (Hardcover, Paperback)
- Pages: 242 (Paperback, excluding author's note)
- ISBN: 0-689-85772-1 (Paperback)
- OCLC: 52753942

America is a young adult novel written by E. R. Frank. It tells the story of America, a biracial boy.

The author of the book, E.R. Frank, is herself a social worker. In an author's note at the end of the book, she says she has worked with many Americas over the years.

The book was made into a 2009 TV movie on the Lifetime Television network, starring Philip Johnson as America and Rosie O'Donnell as his therapist. Although Dr. B is a woman in the movie, Dr. B is portrayed as a man in the novel.

== Plot ==
Born to a crack addict, America was given to a poor white family. They decided they didn't want him anymore after his skin started to darken at the age of five years old. The family's nanny, Sylvia Harper, adopts/fosters America. She had a man named Clark Poignant, and a half-brother named Browning. Clark Poignant befriended America. After a year, America gets sent back to his biological mother by the state. Browning tells America to be as bad as he possibly can, so he will get sent back to them. America's mother lived in a shoddy house in New York City with America's two older brothers, named Brooklyn and Lyle.

America's mother is never around, so five-year-old America has to live with his brothers – aged 7 and 8 – for two years. America, Brooklyn, and Lyle become hooligans, vandalizing and stealing all over the place. However, their luck runs out when an elevator worker finds them scribbling America's numbers all over the elevator. America is sent to a hospital, and Brooklyn and Lyle are sent to a foster home. Soon, he is sent back to Mrs. Harper.

Mrs. Harper has grown old and arthritic, and Browning has moved into America's old bedroom, which they share. Clark Poignant had since died, after he left. However, America has difficulty erasing the cussing and bad behaviors he'd learnt. He soon starts Grade 2, even though he is mostly illiterate. Browning sees that America enjoys being bad and secretly encourages him. When America begins school, he meets Liza, who shares some of his bad behavior, and they develop crushes on each other. Browning's relationship with America continues to develop. He gives America a lighter with a naked lady on it, and gives him alcohol. He also gives America reading lessons with pornographic magazines. Eventually, Browning begins to molest America and has sex with him on occasion. America likes the feeling of Browning touching him so begins to promote his sexual relations. Then Browning introduces America to masturbation and both masturbate together in the room unnoticed.

America discovers that his mother had six children. He also learns about her drug money at the time of each child's birth. America burns the chart and throws the ashes at Browning. Then, out of anger and in a drunken stupor, America sets Browning's bed on fire with his lighter, killing him. America goes to New York and lives with a marijuana dealer named Ty (Charles Tyler). Ty is eventually arrested by the NYPD and America is questioned by a detective. During the interview, he confesses to the murder of Browning. He goes to court, but he is not convicted, so the judge sends him to Applegate.

At Applegate, America befriends Wick, Marshall and Ernie, and is acquainted with the seemingly intellectually disabled Fish. Ernie worries about America. America resists therapy and attempts to destroy a therapist's office after he asked if America's uncle had done anything to him. Ernie is the only one who understands America's plight. Eventually, a distraught America climbs a tree and attempts to hang himself. But Ernie finds him hanging from the tree and saves his life. Shortly after, he is sent to Ridgeway.

At first, America refuses to talk to Dr. B, but eventually he begins to open up to him. America decides to send a letter to Ernie to thank him for saving his life. When Ernie replies, he says he knows America killed a man, but he also knows America is a good person. He mentions Liza, who contacted Applegate looking for him. Three weeks after his sixteenth birthday, he meets Brooklyn. Later, Dr. B tells him America is ready to work in the kitchen. When he is in the kitchen, though, he wastes enormous quantities of carrots because they remind him of cooking dinners with Browning.

When America is 17, Brooklyn enters detox again. America receives a letter from Liza. Dr. B informs America there is a spot open in a transitional home, where he will live with two other young people, Kevin and Ben, and a social worker named Phillip. America decides to go. At the home, America writes Liza and tells her she can come by if she wants. Dr. B informs America his brother Brooklyn has eloped. Liza is finally re-united with America at the home. But America still thinks about what happened to Mrs. Harper and Lyle, and why Brooklyn eloped. He is unable to cook in the home because of painful memories coming up again.

When America is eighteen, he receives a letter from Brooklyn, which tells him that they are brothers, and that they are associated. Dr. B teaches him positive self-talk to eliminate painful memories, but America still wants to see Mrs. Harper. He struggles to tell Liza he truly loves her, and is troubled by the notion of love itself. He visits Mrs. Harper in the nursing home, who is delighted to see him. Mrs. Harper dies several days after his visit. America and Dr. B cry together reading the letter from the nursing home. America feels forgiven by Mrs. Harper, and burns his fifty-seven pairs of shoelaces with his lighter and then he throws his lighter away, symbolism showing his painful memories are gone and he is able to live his life. The books ends with a dream about everyone who had a positive impact on America's life, lifting him up by the hand of God. America says he is found.

== Reception ==
America was listed as the 100th most banned and challenged book in the United States between 2000 and 2009, according to the American Library Association.

== Film adaptation ==
In 2009, the book was made into a feature film America and broadcast as a television film on Lifetime Television. It stars Rosie O'Donnell as the therapist Dr. Maureen Brennan, Ruby Dee as Mrs. Harper and Philip Johnson as America. It was directed by Yves Simoneau and written by Joyce Eliason.
