= Rosie O'Donnell =

American comedian and actress (born 1962)

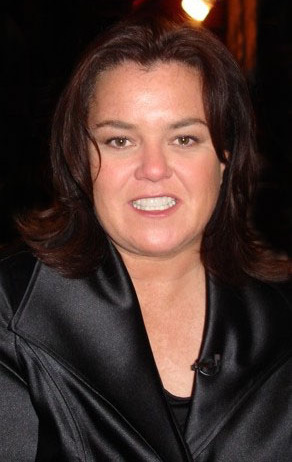
- O'Donnell in 2006
- Born: Roseann O'Donnell; March 21, 1962 (age 64); Commack, New York, U.S.
- Education: Dickinson College; Boston University
- Occupations: Television presenter; comedian; actress
- Years active: 1979–present
- Spouses: Kelli Carpenter (m. 2004; void. 2004) Michelle Rounds (m. 2012; div. 2015)
- Children: 5
- Relatives: Daniel J. O'Donnell (brother)
- Website: rosie.com

Roseann O'Donnell (born March 21, 1962) is an American comedian, actress and television personality. She began her comedy career as a teenager and received her breakthrough on the television series Star Search in 1984. After a series of television and film roles that introduced her to a larger national audience, O'Donnell hosted her own syndicated daytime talk show, The Rosie O'Donnell Show, between 1996 and 2002, which won several Daytime Emmy Awards. During this period, she developed the nickname "Queen of Nice", as well as a reputation for philanthropic efforts.

O'Donnell came out as a lesbian in 2002. An outspoken advocate for lesbian rights and gay adoption issues, she is a foster and adoptive mother. Named The Advocate's 2002 Person of the Year, she became a regular contributor to the magazine in 2023. O'Donnell also continues to be a television producer and a collaborative partner in the LGBT family vacation company R Family Vacations.

From 2006 to 2007, O'Donnell endured a controversial run as the moderator on the daytime talk show The View, which included a public feud with future president Donald Trump and on-air disputes regarding the Bush administration's policies with the Iraq War. She hosted Rosie Radio on Sirius XM Radio between 2009 and 2011, and from 2011 to 2012 hosted a second, short-lived talk show on OWN (the Oprah Winfrey Network), The Rosie Show. O'Donnell returned to The View in 2014, leaving after a brief five-month run due to personal issues. From 2017 to 2019, she starred on the Showtime comedy series SMILF.

In addition to comedy, film, and television, O'Donnell has been a magazine editor, celebrity blogger, and author of several memoirs, including Find Me (2002) and Celebrity Detox (2007). She used the Find Me US$3 million advance to establish her For All foundation and promote other charity projects, encouraging celebrities on her show to take part.

In early 2025, shortly after Trump was inaugurated for a second presidential term, O'Donnell moved to Ireland and applied for Irish citizenship through descent. In July 2025, Trump threatened to revoke her U.S. birthright citizenship.

== Early life ==
O'Donnell was born on March 21, 1962, in Commack, New York, on Long Island, the third of five children of Roseann Teresa (née Murtha; 1934–1973) and Edward Joseph O'Donnell (1933–2015). Her father immigrated from County Donegal, Ireland, during his childhood; her mother was Irish American.

O'Donnell and her siblings were sexually abused by their father as children, and she stated that her family has a history of "generational abuse and alcoholism". "There were a lot of tragic deaths, early deaths and alcoholism. There was a lot of abuse," she said of her father's family. She was raised Catholic. Her brother is Daniel J. O'Donnell, the first openly gay man elected to the New York State Assembly. On March 17, 1973, four days before O'Donnell's eleventh birthday, her mother Roseann died from breast cancer.

While O'Donnell attended Commack High School, she was voted homecoming queen, prom queen, senior class president, and class clown. During high school, she began exploring her interest in comedy, beginning with a skit performed in front of the school in which she imitated Gilda Radner's character, Roseanne Roseannadanna. After graduating in 1980, O'Donnell briefly attended Dickinson College, later transferring to Boston University before ultimately dropping out of college.

== Career ==
=== 1979–1995: Stand-up and early work ===
O'Donnell toured as a stand-up comedian in clubs from 1979 to 1984. She got her first big break on Star Search, explaining on Larry King Live:

I was 20 years old, and I was at a comedy club in Long Island. This woman came over to me and she said, I think you're funny. Can you give me your number? My dad is Ed McMahon. I was like, yeah, right. I gave her my father's phone number. I was living at home, I'm like, whatever. And about three days later, the talent booker from Star Search called and said, we're going to fly you out to L.A. ... I won, like, five weeks in a row. And it gave me national exposure.

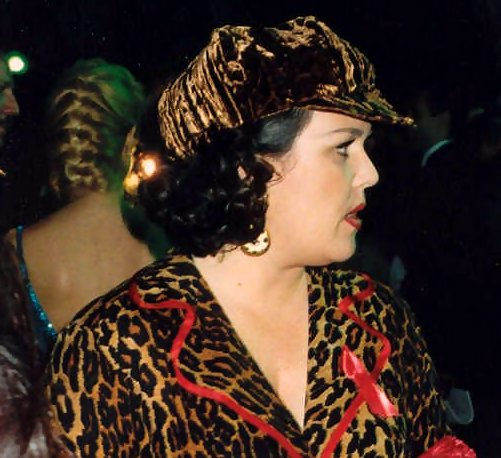
O'Donnell at the 1992 Emmy Awards

After this success, she moved on to television sitcoms, making her series debut as Nell Harper's neighbor on Gimme a Break! in 1986. In 1988, she joined music video station VH1's lineup of veejays. She started hosting a series for VH1, Stand-up Spotlight, a showcase for up-and-coming comedians. In 1992, she starred in Stand By Your Man, a Fox Network sitcom co-starring Melissa Gilbert. The show bombed at the same time as her film career took off. O'Donnell made her feature film debut in A League of Their Own (1992) alongside Tom Hanks, Geena Davis, and Madonna, the latter of whom became a lifelong friend. She was originally considered for the role of Mary Sanderson in Disney's Hocus Pocus, but it was ultimately given to Kathy Najimy. O'Donnell claimed on her blog that she turned down the offer to work with Bette Midler because she refused to portray a frightening evil witch. Throughout her career, she has taken on an eclectic range of roles: she appeared in Sleepless in Seattle as Meg Ryan's character's best friend; as Betty Rubble in the live-action film adaptation of The Flintstones with John Goodman, Elizabeth Perkins, and Rick Moranis; as one of Timothy Hutton's co-stars in Beautiful Girls; as a federal agent comedically paired with Dan Aykroyd in Exit to Eden; as the voice of a tomboyish female gorilla named Terk in Disney's Tarzan; and as a baseball-loving nun in M. Night Shyamalan's Wide Awake.

O'Donnell was considered for the role of Elaine Benes on Seinfeld.

=== 1996–2002: The Rosie O'Donnell Show ===
In 1996, she began hosting a daytime talk show, The Rosie O'Donnell Show, for her production company KidRo Productions. The show proved very successful, winning multiple Emmy Awards, and earning O'Donnell the title of "The Queen of Nice" for her style of light-hearted banter with her guests and interactions with the audience. As part of her playful banter with her studio audience, O'Donnell often launched Koosh balls at the crowd and camera. She also professed an infatuation with Tom Cruise.

With New York City as the show's home base, O'Donnell displayed her love of Broadway musicals and plays by having cast members as guests, encouraging the audience to see shows, premiering production numbers as well as promoting shows with ticket giveaways.

After the Columbine shootings, O'Donnell became an outspoken supporter of gun control and a major figure in the Million Mom March. During the April 19, 1999, broadcast of her talk show, she stated, "You are not allowed to own a gun, and if you do own a gun, I think you should go to prison." O'Donnell previously had remarked, "I don't personally own a gun, but if you are qualified, licensed and registered, I have no problem." In May 1999, a month after the Columbine shootings, O'Donnell interviewed Tom Selleck, who was promoting The Love Letter. O'Donnell interrogated him about his recent unpaid commercial for the National Rifle Association of America (NRA) and questioned him about the NRA's position on the use of "assault weapons". She said at the end of the segment the conversation had "not gone the way I had hoped" and added "if you feel insulted by my questions, I apologize because it was not a personal attack. It was meant to bring up the subject as it is in the consciousness of so many today." At the time, O'Donnell was a multi-million dollar paid spokesperson for Kmart, which was the largest volume firearms retailer in the United States. Around the same time, the cast from Annie Get Your Gun was to appear on the show but refused O'Donnell's request to remove the line "I can shoot a partridge with a single cartridge" from the song "Anything You Can Do" and agreed to perform "My Defenses Are Down" instead.

Later in 1999, O'Donnell discontinued her contract with Kmart as their spokeswoman, as gun enthusiasts complained that she should not be the spokesperson for the largest gun retailer. O'Donnell countered that Kmart sells hunting rifles, not handguns or assault weapons and does so legally, which she supports. Both Kmart and O'Donnell denied publicly that Kmart had terminated the contract. In May 2000, O'Donnell's bodyguard applied for a concealed firearm permit. O'Donnell stated that the security firm contracted by Warner Bros. requested the gun. O'Donnell stated that because of threats, she and her family needed protection.

After the September 11, 2001 attacks, Broadway and tourism in New York City was down and many shows were in danger of closing. O'Donnell was among many in the entertainment field who encouraged viewers to visit and support the performing arts. She announced that she would donate 1 million dollars for aid in the rescue efforts and encouraged other celebrities and citizens alike to "give till it hurts".

In June 2002, she left her talk show. The show was replaced by The Caroline Rhea Show, with comedian Caroline Rhea, which ran for one additional season.

In December 2002, O'Donnell hosted the reunion special for season four of the reality competition series Survivor, Survivor: Marquesas, taking over hosting duties from Bryant Gumbel. She would be replaced the following season, Survivor: Thailand, by series host Jeff Probst for the remainder of the series up until it did away with reunion shows after Survivor: Island of the Idols in 2019; Jeff Probst returned for Survivor 50: In the Hands of the Fans in 2026.

O'Donnell was a guest star on an episode of HBO show Curb Your Enthusiasm entitled "The Bowtie" in 2005.

=== 2006–2007: The View ===
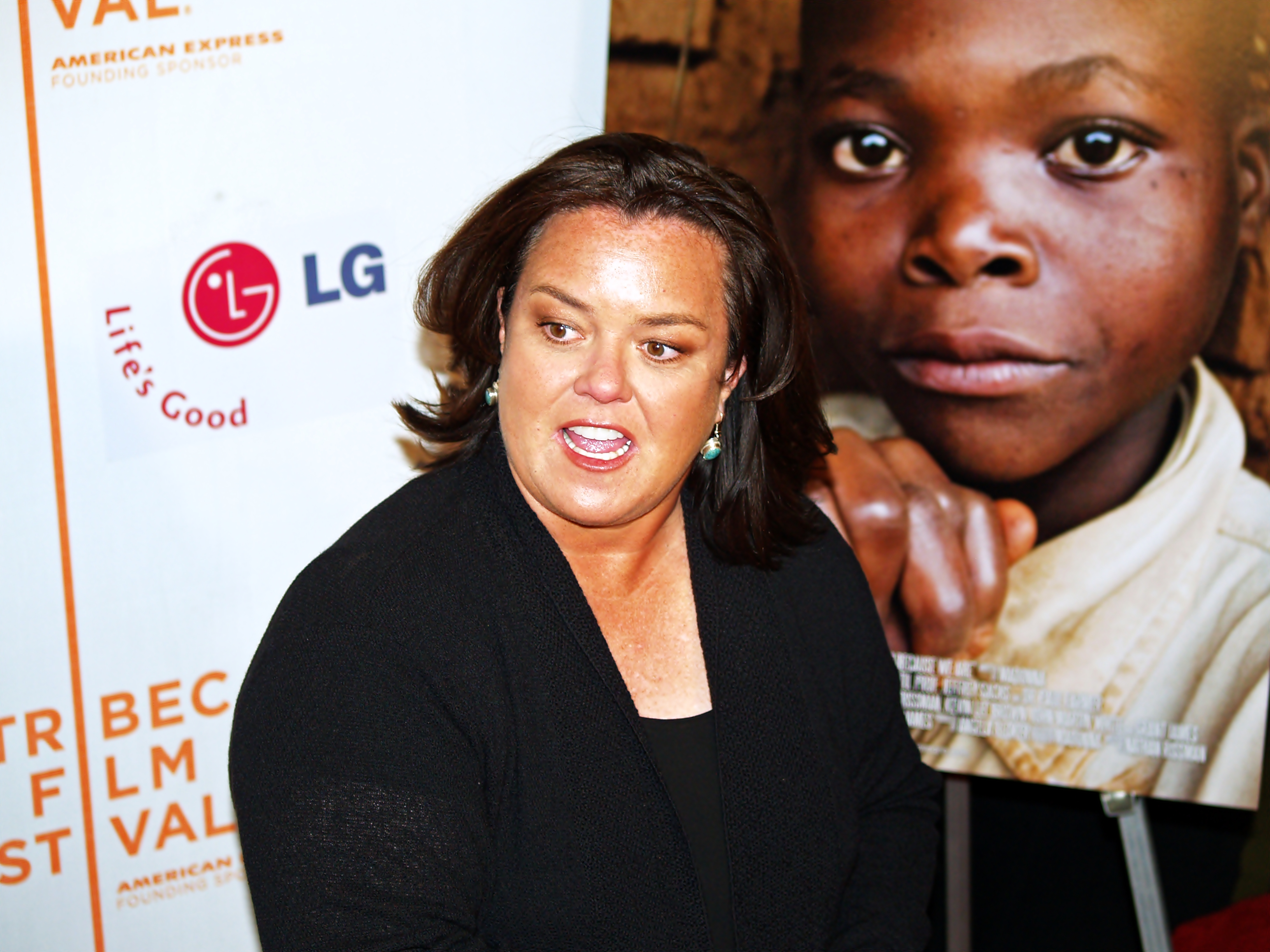
O'Donnell at the 2008 Tribeca Film Festival premiere for the I Am Because We Are documentary, about the millions of orphans in the African country of Malawi who lost parents and siblings to HIV and AIDS

In September 2006, O'Donnell replaced Meredith Vieira as a co-host and moderator of The View, a daytime women-oriented talk show. Star Jones, a co-host on the show, quit, with some speculating Jones's conservative views would be in constant tension with O'Donnell's more liberal counterpoint. O'Donnell had also disputed Jones's route of rapid weight loss, alluding that it must have been through gastric bypass surgery, rather than dieting and exercise alone as Jones had insisted, which also fed speculation about certain tension between the two. (Jones later confirmed that surgery was involved.) O'Donnell was credited with keeping the show's "buzz factor up". She was also credited with making it more news-focused, though it still embraced the "fluff" of daytime TV talk shows (celebrities, fashion, and food). Despite an overall downward trend for most daytime broadcast shows, ratings rose by 27% during O'Donnell's first year on The View. The show was the fourth-most-watched in all of daytime in the key demographic of women ages 18–49 and scored record ratings in the total viewer category with an average of 3.4 million viewers—up 15% versus the same time in 2005. O'Donnell moderated the opening "Hot Topics" portion of the show, where news items were discussed. O'Donnell gave the show a more political slant, and she and fellow comic Joy Behar often gave strong opinions against former President Bush's domestic and foreign policies, including the Iraq War. As a conservative counterpoint, Elisabeth Hasselbeck would usually support the Bush administration's policies and the two would get into an adversarial give-and-take.

In November 2006, Rosie commented on Kelly Ripa's complaints to Regis Philbin about guest co-host Clay Aiken on Live with Regis and Kelly. Kelly said she was angry at Aiken for jokingly putting his hand over her mouth during an interview segment. Rosie told the other panelist on The View that Kelly made a homophobic comment about Clay. Kelly was watching the segment and quickly called into the live segment to tell Rosie that Kelly's complaint about Aiken was not about homophobia; the issue was it was flu season. In the past, Kelly had placed her hand over Regis' mouth as a joke during non-flu season.

Encouraged by the show to be outspoken, O'Donnell sometimes provoked debate, at one time stating "radical Christianity is just as threatening as radical Islam." On the February 24, 2003, episode of Phil Donahue's talk show, O'Donnell referred to the sexual abuse scandal in the Catholic archdiocese of Boston resulting in $157 million awarded to 983 claimants, stating "I hope the Catholic Church gets sued until the end of time. Maybe, you know, we can melt down some of the gold toilets in the Pope's Vatican and pay off some of the lawsuits because, the whole tenet of living a Christ-like life, has been lost in Catholicism."

O'Donnell joked about communion rituals alongside co-host Behar's drunk priest comments. On April 19, 2007, the panel discussed the Supreme Court of the United States's ruling in Gonzales v. Carhart, a decision upholding the Partial-Birth Abortion Ban Act. O'Donnell cited a Florynce Kennedy quote, "If men could get pregnant abortion would be a sacrament" and asked rhetorically "How many Supreme Court judges are Catholic?" and "How about separation of church and state?" Some conservative commentators deemed her statements "anti-Catholic bigotry" and suggested that such statements against other religions would not be tolerated. O'Donnell's outspokenness and spontaneousness sometimes led to her views being recirculated by other media outlets, often surprising The View co-hosts including O'Donnell. Frequently portrayed unfavorably by conservative media outlets and what she deemed as Republican pundits, O'Donnell lamented that they were focusing on her comments instead of more important national and world issues.

On December 5, 2006, O'Donnell used a series of ching chongs to imitate newscasters in China. Vanessa Hua of the San Francisco Chronicle expressed disappointment in O'Donnell, given the comedian's championing of LGBT rights. On December 14, O'Donnell apologized to those she offended, explaining that "Some people have told me it's as bad as the n-word. I was like, really? I didn't know that." O'Donnell warned that "there's a good chance I'll do something like that again, probably in the next week, not on purpose. Only 'cause it's how my brain works." Time called it a "pseudo-apology". O'Donnell later wrote in Celebrity Detox that "I wish I had been a bit more pure in my public apology."

In December 2006, O'Donnell criticized Donald Trump for holding a press conference to reinstate Miss USA Tara Conner, who had violated pageant guidelines, accusing him of using her scandal to "generate publicity for the Miss USA Pageant" (to which he owned the rights) by announcing he was giving her a second chance. O'Donnell commented that due to Trump's multiple marital affairs and questionable business bankruptcies, he was not a moral authority for young people in America. She stated, "Left the first wife, had an affair. Left the second wife, had an affair – but he's the moral compass for 20-year-olds in America." In response, Trump began a "vicious" mass media blitz in which he appeared on various television shows, either in person or by phone, threatening to sue O'Donnell (he never did). He called her names, insulted her by saying he would "send one of my friends to pick up her girlfriend [Kelli] and I think it would be easy", and claimed that Barbara Walters regretted hiring her. Walters was stuck in the middle as a social acquaintance of Trump's, and said O'Donnell did not feel like Walters defended her enough, which led to what both women agreed was an unfortunate confrontation in one of the dressing rooms. "I had pain and hurt and rejection," O'Donnell said, "sometimes [my emotions] overwhelm me. Sometimes I get flooded." Walters denied that she was unhappy with O'Donnell, saying, "I have never regretted, nor do I now, the hiring of Rosie O'Donnell." Rosie and Donald Trump have a history of feuding on social media and on television since December 2006.

On April 25, 2007, ABC announced that O'Donnell would be leaving the show before the end of the year because of a failure to reach agreement on a new contract.

O'Donnell condemned many of the Bush administration's policies, especially the war in Iraq and the resulting occupation. She also questioned the official explanation for the destruction of the World Trade Center, and stating in one episode, "I do believe that it's the first time in history that fire has ever melted steel". She consistently mentioned recent military deaths and news about the war and criticized the U.S. media for its lack of attention to these issues compared to media coverage throughout the world. This led to a series of heated exchanges with co-host Hasselbeck, as well as "the most-discussed moment of her professional life." On May 17, 2007, O'Donnell rhetorically asked, "655,000 Iraqi civilians dead. Who are the terrorists? ... if you were in Iraq and another country, the United States, the richest in the world, invaded your country and killed 655,000 of your citizens, what would you call us?" Conservative commentators criticized O'Donnell's statements, saying that she was comparing American soldiers to terrorists. On May 23, 2007, a heated discussion ensued, in part, because of what O'Donnell perceived as Elisabeth Hasselbeck's unwillingness to defend O'Donnell from the criticisms; O'Donnell asked Hasselbeck, "Do you believe I think our troops are terrorists?" Hasselbeck answered in the negative but also stated "Defend your own insinuations." O'Donnell was hurt and felt Hasselbeck had betrayed her friendship: "there's something about somebody being different on TV toward you than they are in the dressing room. It didn't really ring true for me." O'Donnell stated that Republican pundits were mischaracterising her statements and the right-wing media would portray her as a bully, attacking "innocent pure Christian Elisabeth" whenever they disagreed. O'Donnell decided to leave the show that day, but afterwards stated that the reason was not the argument itself, but rather the fact that she saw on the studio monitor that the camera had shown a split screen, with her and Hasselbeck on either side. O'Donnell felt that the show's director and producer "had to prepare that in advance ... I felt there was setup egging me into that position. The executive producer and I did not gel." O'Donnell and ABC agreed to cut short her contract agreement on May 25, 2007. ABC News reported that her arguments with Hasselbeck brought the show its best ratings ever. O'Donnell was replaced by Whoopi Goldberg as the moderator of The View.

In May 2007, Time magazine included O'Donnell in their annual list of the 100 most influential people. O'Donnell was named "The Most Annoying Celebrity of 2007" by a PARADE reader's poll, in response she said, "Frankly, most celebrities are annoying ... and I suppose I am the most annoying, but, whatever."

In 2008, The View won an Emmy for "Outstanding Special Class Writing" for a specially themed Autism episode that O'Donnell helped create. Janette Barber, O'Donnell's longtime friend and producer/writer of The Rosie O'Donnell Show, accepted the award on behalf of herself and the other two winners, Christian McKiernan and Andrew Smith.

=== 2007–2012: The Rosie Show and blog ===
In March 2007, O'Donnell started a video blog, Jahero, on her website Rosie.com answering fans questions, giving behind the scenes information and serving as a video diary. Originally featuring only O'Donnell and her hair and makeup artist Helene Macaulay, they were soon joined by her writer from The Rosie O'Donnell Show, Janette Barber. Called Jahero, a name composed of the first two letters of each of their first names, they occasionally had short cameo appearances by View co-hosts Joy Behar, Elisabeth Hasselbeck, and Barbara Walters. Jenny McCarthy appeared once briefly, as has Hasselbeck's mother-in-law and O'Donnell's mother-in-law, her (now) ex-wife Kelli's mother. Kathy Griffin also appeared, where she read some of the questions. It became so popular that O'Donnell and her creative team considered an "on the road" version of the video blog using fan-submitted suggestions. O'Donnell was the front runner for the "best celebrity blogger" category in the 2007 Blogger's Choice Awards which she won.

O'Donnell expressed interest in replacing long time host Bob Barker when he retired from CBS's game show The Price Is Right. Barker was a frequent guest on her talk show and told reporters that she "would make a fine host". Although it was reported he had "endorsed" her as a "possible successor", Barker said that he had no role in choosing his replacement. In June 2007, she announced on her blog it was not going to happen and noted she was reluctant to uproot her family to move to California.

In 2008, O'Donnell starred in and executive produced America, a Lifetime channel film in which she plays the therapist of the title character, a 16-year-old boy aging out of the foster care system. The film is based on the E.R. Frank book of the same name. In October 2009, she appeared in the original cast of Love, Loss, and What I Wore.

In November 2009, "Rosie Radio", a daily two-hour show with O'Donnell discussing news and events on Sirius XM Radio, premiered. O'Donnell said she was approached by the company after she appeared on Howard Stern's Sirius XM show. The radio show ended in June 2011. In 2009, O'Donnell made another guest appearance on Curb Your Enthusiasm, where she beat up Larry twice, in an episode titled Denise Handicapped.

In 2011, O'Donnell began producing material for the Oprah Winfrey Network (OWN). In May 2011, The Doc Club with Rosie O'Donnell premiered, a show where O'Donnell moderated live panel discussions following premieres of OWN Documentaries. She has hosted specials for Becoming Chaz in May 2011 and Miss Representation in October 2011. In fall 2011, O'Donnell began full-time work on her new show, The Rosie Show, for OWN. The show taped at the Chicago studio formerly home to The Oprah Winfrey Show. The show debuted on October 10, 2011, to generally positive reviews. OWN canceled The Rosie Show on March 16, 2012, with the last show taped March 20, on the eve of O'Donnell's 50th birthday. The final show aired on OWN on March 29, 2012. In a statement, Oprah Winfrey said:

I thank Rosie from the bottom of my heart for joining me on this journey. She has been an incredible partner, working to deliver the best possible show every single day. As I have learned in the last 15 months, a new network launch is always a challenge and ratings grow over time as you continue to gather an audience. I'm grateful to Rosie and the dedicated Rosie Show team for giving it their all.

O'Donnell responded to the cancellation by thanking her viewers and the host city of Chicago:

I loved working with Oprah in the amazing city of Chicago. I was welcomed with open arms and will never forget the kindness of all I encountered. It was a great year for me—I wish the show was able to attract more viewers—but it did not. So I am headed back to my home in New York—with gratitude. On we go!

In 2011, O'Donnell made another guest appearance on Curb Your Enthusiasm, competing for the affection of a bisexual woman with Larry in an episode called "The Bi-Sexual".

=== 2013–2016: The Fosters and return to The View ===
In 2013, O'Donnell appeared in a number of television shows. First, she played "brash but astute" reporter Dottie Shannon in an episode of Bomb Girls, followed by playing the voice of the Bouncing Bumble Queen in Jake and the Never Land Pirates. After that, also in 2013, she appeared in two episodes of Smash as herself. That same year she also appeared as herself in an episode of Impractical Jokers called "Everything's Rosie".

In 2014, O'Donnell landed a reoccurring role as Rita Hendricks on The Fosters, "a tough yet compassionate woman who works for the foster care system and becomes a mentor to a member of the Foster family." The character lasted through their 2016 season.

In the fall of 2014, O'Donnell returned to The View as a co-host, with a newly re-vamped version of the show, along with Whoopi Goldberg returning as moderator and new co-hosts Rosie Perez and Nicolle Wallace. On February 6, 2015, representatives for O'Donnell confirmed she would once again exit the panel. In a statement, made to The Hollywood Reporter, O'Donnell said, "[My health] got a little bit worse right before the holidays — [my doctor] was kind of concerned. ... I can't really fix [my personal life] right away, but I can fix [my job]."

In 2015, O'Donnell made a cameo in Pitch Perfect 2, playing a co-host on The View. Deadline called the cameo "a bit that already seems dated." That same year, she appeared in an episode of Empire, playing Pepper O'Leary, "a tough criminal who shared a cell for years with Cookie Lyon." In preparation for the role, she hired an acting coach and stated, "I prepared for this like I've never prepared for anything in my career, because I didn't want to disappoint and I understood the pace at which they work." O'Donnell also appeared as herself in two documentaries that same year. In April 2015, Roseanne For President! was released, a film about Roseanne Barr's presidential bid in 2012. O'Donnell appeared in the film alongside Michael Moore and Sandra Bernhard. In September 2015, the documentary Everything Is Copy was released, a film by Jacob Bernstein about his mother Nora Ephron. O'Donnell appeared in the documentary to help "bring his mother into focus" along with a number of other celebrities.

In 2016, O'Donnell made a two-episode appearance in the CBS series Mom, playing Jeanine, "the ex-girlfriend of Bonnie (Allison Janney)". That same year, she was also a regular panelist on Match Game and appeared in one episode of The $100,000 Pyramid, where she competed against Kathy Najimy. Later that year, O'Donnell also played the role of the gym teacher in Hairspray Live!

=== 2017–present: Return to acting ===
In November 2016, Showtime announced she had joined the cast of the comedy pilot SMILF. The series aired from November 5, 2017, until March 31, 2019, and O'Donnell received critical acclaim for her portrayal of Tutu. On April 3, 2019, it was announced that O'Donnell would play the role of Lisa Sheffer in the HBO series I Know This Much Is True.

In 2021, O'Donnell guest starred on the series Run the World and The L Word: Generation Q. On June 15, 2021, it was announced that she would star as Detective Sunday, alongside Jon Bernthal, in a series reboot of American Gigolo on Showtime, premiering in 2022. In 2022 she voiced the role of the MTA subway announcements in the second season of Netflix series Russian Doll starring Natasha Lyonne. That same year she appeared as Vi in the Amazon Prime Video series A League of Their Own (2022).

== Other ventures ==
=== Rosie magazine ===
In 2000, O'Donnell partnered with the publishers of McCall's to revamp the magazine as Rosie's McCall's (or, more commonly, Rosie). The magazine was launched as a competitor to fellow talk show hostess Oprah Winfrey's monthly magazine O. Rosie covered issues including breast cancer, foster care, and other matters of concern to O'Donnell. In the September 2000 issue, she shared that "she has struggled with depression her entire life" and decided to start medications when she realized her fears were affecting her family. With a strong start and a circulation close to 3.5 million, things looked promising, but the magazine stumbled as conflicts emerged between O'Donnell and the editors. The contract gave O'Donnell control over editorial process and editorial staff but veto power remained with publisher Gruner+Jahr USA. O'Donnell quit the magazine in September 2002, following a dispute over editorial control. "If I'm going to have my name and my brand on the corner of a magazine, it has to be my vision" she told People.

Rosie magazine folded in 2003. In late 2003, O'Donnell and the publishers each sued the other for breach of contract. The publishers said that, by removing herself from the magazine's publication, she was in breach of contract. The trial received considerable press coverage. O'Donnell would often give brief press interviews outside of the courtroom responding to various allegations. Of note was a former magazine colleague and breast cancer survivor who testified that O'Donnell said to her on the phone that people who lie "get sick and they get cancer. If they keep lying, they get it again". O'Donnell apologized the next day and stated, "I'm sorry I hurt her the way I did, that was not my intention." The judge, Ira Gammerman of the New York Supreme Court in Manhattan, dismissed the case, ruling that neither side should receive damages.

=== Books ===
In 1997, Rosie released the children's book Kids are Punny: Jokes Sent by Kids to the Rosie O'Donnell Show, which contained jokes she had received from children. A sequel titled Kids are Punny 2: More Jokes Sent by Kids to the Rosie O'Donnell Show was released a year later in 1998, and an HBO special was made based on the books. In April 2002, O'Donnell released Find Me, a combination of memoir, mystery and detective story with an underlying interest in reuniting birth mothers with their children. In addition to cataloging her childhood and early adulthood, the book delved into O'Donnell's relationship with a woman with dissociative identity disorder who posed as an underage teen who had become pregnant by rape. The book reached number two on The New York Times bestseller list.

In October 2007, she released Celebrity Detox, her second memoir which focuses on the struggles with leaving fame behind, noting her exits from The Rosie O'Donnell Show and The View.

=== R Family Vacations ===
In 2003, O'Donnell and Carpenter partnered with travel entrepreneur Gregg Kaminsky to launch R Family Vacations catering to LGBT families, "the very first all gay and lesbian family vacation packages" where "gays and lesbians can bring their kids, their friends, and their parents." Although O'Donnell is not involved on a day-to-day basis, she does contribute to the creative aspects of "advertising and marketing materials" and initiated the idea for the company when she filled in as a last-minute replacement headliner on one of Kaminsky's Atlantis Events gay cruises and also came up with the name "R Family Vacations". On July 11, 2004, the first cruise was held with 1600 passengers including 600 children. In addition to traditional entertainment and recreational activities, the company partnered with Provincetown's Family Pride, a 25-year-old Washington, D.C.–based organization that advocates for LGBT families to host discussions on "adoption, insemination, surrogacy, and everything else that would be helpful to gay parenting." All Aboard! Rosie's Family Cruise, a documentary film about the trip debuted on HBO on April 6, 2006, and was nominated for three Emmy Awards. Of the experience, O'Donnell stated "we didn't really realize the magic that was going to take place. People who had never met another gay family met other families and it was powerful."

=== Taboo ===
In late 2003, O'Donnell brought the musical Taboo to Broadway. She hired Charles Busch to re-write the book, and the story became "bitchier" and more focused on the rise to fame of the character based on Boy George. It closed on February 8, 2004, after about 100 performances and "mostly bad" reviews. O'Donnell described the show's production as "by far the most fulfilling experience of my career". She has stated that she intends to bring the show back to Broadway, although Scott Miller writes that people are hesitant to get involved after the "train wreck" of the original production.

== Charitable work ==
Over her career, O'Donnell has developed a reputation for raising funds and her own philanthropy to charitable causes. In May 1996, Warner Books advanced O'Donnell $3 million to write a memoir. She used the money to seed her For All Kids Foundation to help institute national standards for day care across the country.

Since 1997, Rosie's For All Kids Foundation, overseen by Elizabeth Birch, has awarded more than $22 million in Early Childhood Care and Education program grants to over 900 nonprofit organizations. On October 30, 2006, she was honored by the New York Society for the Prevention of Cruelty to Children. "It's our privilege to be honoring and hosting Rosie," said NYSPCC president David Stack in a statement. "Her Rosie's for All Kids Foundation has awarded more than $22 million in grants to over 1,400 child-related organizations, and that's just one of her many impressive activities on behalf of children." In November 2006, Nightline aired a video report about the opening of The Children's Plaza and Family Center in Renaissance Village, a FEMA trailer park in Louisiana. This was an emergency response initiative of Rosie's For All Kids Foundation with the help of many local nonprofit organizations and for-profit businesses, all efforts were to assist the families displaced by Hurricane Katrina.

San Francisco public relations firm Fineman Associates awarded top prize to Procter & Gamble's designation of O'Donnell as "unkissable" in a promotion for Scope mouthwash on the 1997 annual list of the nation's worst public relations blunders. In response to the promotion, O'Donnell partnered with Warner–Lambert's competitor Listerine, who donated bottles of mouthwash to the studio audience and donated $1,000 to charity every time a hosted guest would kiss her in exchange for O'Donnell promoting their product. On occasion, the guests would offer multiple kisses, and People reported O'Donnell "smooched her way to more than $350,000".

In 2003, O'Donnell and Kelli O'Donnell collaborated with Artistic Director Lori Klinger to create Rosie's Broadway Kids, dedicated to providing free instruction in music and dance to New York City public schools or students. Rosie's Broadway Kids serves more than 4,500 teachers, students, and their family members at 21 schools. Currently, programs are in Harlem, Midtown West, Chelsea, Lower East Side, East Village, and Chinatown. All net profits from O'Donnell's 2007 book Celebrity Detox are also being donated to Rosie's Broadway Kids.

In December 2006, at a one-night charity event on the Norwegian Pearl cruise ship, Elizabeth Birch, executive director for the Rosie's For All Kids Foundation, confirmed that $50 million from O'Donnell's five-year contract were donated in an irrevocable trust to charity. She is also reported to have contributed several hundred thousand dollars for rehabilitation therapies for war veterans who have lost limbs in Iraq and Afghanistan wars. On The Tyra Banks Show, Banks brought up to O'Donnell that people do not realize that O'Donnell has given more than $100 million to charity. In May 2007, O'Donnell and Pogo.com announced a joint effort to raise money for Rosie's All Kids Foundation. EA, which owns Pogo.com, committed $30,000 and more money can be raised based on the amount of playing time people spend on certain games. They also held a sweepstakes in which winners get to fly to New York and meet O'Donnell and attend a charity function as her guest.

During the summer of 2007, O'Donnell was a guest on the multi-artist True Colors Tour, which traveled through 15 cities in the United States and Canada. The tour, sponsored by the gay cable channel Logo, began on June 8, 2007. Hosted by comedian Margaret Cho and headlined by Cyndi Lauper, the tour also included Debbie Harry, Erasure, The Gossip, Rufus Wainwright, The Dresden Dolls, The MisShapes, Indigo Girls, The Cliks, and other special guests. Profits from the tour helped to benefit the Human Rights Campaign as well as P-FLAG and The Matthew Shepard Foundation. She appeared again on True Colors Tour 2008.

== Personal life ==
O'Donnell was a resident of Nyack, New York, after her 1996 purchase of "Pretty Penny", a Victorian river home previously occupied by Helen Hayes. O'Donnell later sold the home to businessman Edward M. Kopko in 2000. She has lived in South Nyack, New York, and owns a home in West Palm Beach, Florida. O'Donnell relocated to the West Coast in the early 2020s.

O'Donnell is a Democrat. She has contributed funds to multiple political campaigns, including to the campaign to elect Senator Doug Jones of Alabama.

On numerous occasions, O'Donnell has been outspoken about controversial topics. In 2007, she announced her opinion concerning the September 11, 2001 terrorist attacks on the World Trade Center, in which she questioned NIST conclusions, and alleged the United States government's involvement in the attacks.

In March 2025, shortly after Trump was inaugurated for a second term, O'Donnell revealed in a TikTok video that she had moved to Ireland with her child, Clay, that January. She said "It's been heartbreaking to see what's happening politically, and hard for me personally as well. The personal is political, as we all know." She went on to say that she and Clay "just felt like we needed to take care of ourselves and make some hard decisions and follow through". O'Donnell applied for Irish citizenship through descent. Trump threatened in July 2025 to revoke US-born O'Donnell's birthright US citizenship. Initially O'Donnell moved to the Dublin coastal village of Howth in a rental house. After a few months, influenced by the local specialist school for her autistic child, they moved to the Dublin coastal suburb of Sandymount.

=== Sexual orientation ===
In her January 31, 2002, appearance on the sitcom Will & Grace, she played a lesbian mother. A month later, as part of her act at the Ovarian Cancer Research benefit at Caroline's Comedy Club, O'Donnell came out as a lesbian, announcing "I'm a dyke! [...] I don't know why people make such a big deal about the gay thing. [...] People are confused, they're shocked, like this is a big revelation to somebody." The announcement came two months before the end of her talk show. Although she also cited the need to put a face to gays and lesbians, her primary reason was to bring attention to LGBTQ adoption issues. O'Donnell is a foster and adoptive mother. She protested against adoption agencies, particularly in Florida, that refused adoptive rights to gay and lesbian parents.

Diane Sawyer interviewed O'Donnell in a March 14, 2002, episode of PrimeTime Thursday. O'Donnell told USA Today that she chose to talk to Sawyer because she wanted an investigative piece on Florida's ban on gay adoption. She told Sawyer if that was done, "I would like to talk about my life and how (the case) pertains to me." She spoke about two gay men in Florida who faced having a foster child they raised removed from their home. State law would not let them adopt because Florida banned gay couples and lesbian couples from adopting. O'Donnell's coming out drew criticism from some LGBTQ activists, who cited her repeated references to being enamored of Tom Cruise on The Rosie O'Donnell Show as deceptive. She responded in her act stating, "I said I wanted him to mow my lawn and bring me a lemonade. I never said I wanted to blow him." After leaving her show and coming out, O'Donnell returned to stand-up comedy and cut her hair, telling the press that her haircut was meant to mimic that of former Culture Club backup singer Helen Terry.

O'Donnell was named 2002's Person of the Year by The Advocate, and, in May 2003, she became a regular columnist for the magazine. The magazine's editor-in-chief, Judy Wieder, stated, "Today, Rosie's long and brave journey has led her not only to the cover of The Advocate – Rosie was honored with the magazine's Person of the Year Award for 2002 – but now to its chorus of voices, as a columnist."

=== Marriages and children ===
O'Donnell adopted her first child, Parker Jaren O'Donnell, as an infant in 1995. Parker is an aficionado of military history and in 2011 successfully lobbied his mother to send him to Valley Forge Military Academy. O'Donnell adopted a baby girl, Chelsea, in 1997.

In 1997 O'Donnell's brother set her up on a blind date with Kelli Carpenter, a Nickelodeon marketing executive. The couple adopted a boy, Blake, at birth in 1999. In 2000, the family took in foster child Mia (born in 1997), and announced intentions to adopt her. In 2001, the State of Florida removed Mia from their home, and O'Donnell has since worked extensively to bring an end to the Florida law prohibiting same-sex family adoption. In 2002, Carpenter gave birth to their fourth child, Vivienne, through artificial insemination.

The couple got married in San Francisco on February 26, 2004, two weeks after Mayor Gavin Newsom authorized the granting of marriage licenses to same-sex couples. Her decision to marry Carpenter in San Francisco was seen as a show of defiance against then-President George W. Bush over his support for the Federal Marriage Amendment. She said in 2004, "We were both inspired to come here after the sitting President made the vile and hateful comments he made [...] [O]ne thought ran through my mind on the plane out here – with Liberty and Social justice for all." The couple was married by San Francisco Treasurer Susan Leal, one of the city's highest-ranking lesbian officials, and serenaded by the San Francisco Gay Men's Chorus. O'Donnell said during the trial over Rosie magazine she had decided to marry Carpenter, in part because even though they acted as spouses they legally were no closer than friends:

We applied for spousal privilege and were denied it by the state. As a result, everything that I said to Kelli, every letter that I wrote her, every e-mail, every correspondence and conversation was entered into the record [...] I am now and will forever be a total proponent of gay marriage.

Their marriage ended in August 2004, when it was among thousands voided by the California Supreme Court. In November 2009, O'Donnell disclosed that Carpenter had moved out of their home in 2007.

O'Donnell began dating 40-year-old executive-search consultant Michelle Rounds in mid-2011. On December 5, 2011, during a break in the taping of The Rosie Show, O'Donnell announced to her studio audience that she and Rounds were engaged. The two married in a private ceremony in New York on June 9, 2012. On January 9, 2013, the couple announced they had adopted a baby girl named Dakota, who goes by Clay. In February 2015, O'Donnell filed for divorce from Rounds after two years of marriage, and it was settled by October. O'Donnell was awarded full custody of their daughter. Rounds died by suicide on September 15, 2017.

In August 2015, O'Donnell tweeted that her 17-year-old daughter, Chelsea, had gone missing from their home in Nyack along with her therapy dog. Chelsea was found a week later in Barnegat, New Jersey. In 2024, Chelsea was arrested several times on charges involving drugs, child neglect, domestic abuse, and bail jumping.

=== Health ===
O'Donnell has suffered with mental issues her entire life, attributing it to the sexual abuse that was inflicted on her by her father when she was a child. She struggles with major depressive disorder, PTSD, anxiety issues, and body-image issues and takes antidepressants. On her body-image struggles, she said, "I think it's what your body does to protect you if you’re a kid who's sexually abused, which I was."

In the summer of 2000, O'Donnell suffered a staphylococcal infection after she accidentally cut a finger, which incapacitated her for weeks and nearly led to her hand being amputated. O'Donnell has acknowledged her struggles with recurrent major depressive episodes during the fall and winter months consistent with seasonal affective disorder.

In 2008, O'Donnell said that she was not an alcoholic, and had temporarily given up alcohol to lose weight. She wrote on her blog: "'Cause I was drinking too much, 'cause I didn't want to any more, 'cause it is hard to lose weight when drinking, 'cause I can never have only one." She started drinking again following President Trump's first election victory in 2016, revealing, "I was very, very depressed. I was overeating. I was overdrinking [...] I was so depressed."

O'Donnell suffered a heart attack in mid-August 2012. She said an artery was 99 percent blocked and a stent was inserted. She later posted on Twitter that to reverse her heart disease she would adopt the whole foods, plant-based diet promoted by Caldwell Esselstyn.

O'Donnell has Type 2 diabetes.

== Awards and nominations ==
Award	Year	Work	Category	Result	Ref.
Daytime Emmy Awards	1997	The Rosie O'Donnell Show	Outstanding Talk Show	Nominated	
Daytime Emmy Awards	1997	The Rosie O'Donnell Show	Outstanding Talk/Service Show Host	Won	
Daytime Emmy Awards	1998	The Rosie O'Donnell Show	Outstanding Talk Show	Won	
Daytime Emmy Awards	1998	The Rosie O'Donnell Show	Outstanding Talk/Service Show Host	Won (tied with Oprah Winfrey)	
Daytime Emmy Awards	1998	The Rosie O'Donnell Show	Outstanding Writing – Special Class	Nominated	
Daytime Emmy Awards	1999	The Rosie O'Donnell Show	Outstanding Talk Show	Won	
Daytime Emmy Awards	1999	The Rosie O'Donnell Show	Outstanding Talk Show Host	Won	
Daytime Emmy Awards	1999	The Rosie O'Donnell Show	Outstanding Writing – Special Class	Nominated	
Daytime Emmy Awards	2000	The Rosie O'Donnell Show	Outstanding Talk Show	Won	
Daytime Emmy Awards	2000	The Rosie O'Donnell Show	Outstanding Talk Show Host	Won	
Daytime Emmy Awards	2001	The Rosie O'Donnell Show	Outstanding Talk Show	Won	
Daytime Emmy Awards	2001	The Rosie O'Donnell Show	Outstanding Talk Show Host	Won(tied with Regis Philbin)	
Daytime Emmy Awards	2002	The Rosie O'Donnell Show	Outstanding Talk Show	Won	
Daytime Emmy Awards	2002	The Rosie O'Donnell Show	Outstanding Talk Show Host	Won	
Daytime Emmy Awards	2007	The Rosie O'Donnell Show	Outstanding Talk Show Host	Nominated	
Emmy Awards	1995	Rosie O'Donnell (stand-up comedy special)	Outstanding Individual Performance in a Variety or Music Program	Nominated	
Emmy Awards	1996	The Larry Sanders Show	Outstanding Guest Actress in a Comedy Series	Nominated	
Emmy Awards	1999	Kids Are Punny	Outstanding Children's Program	Nominated	
Emmy Awards	1999	52nd Annual Tony Awards	Outstanding Variety, Music or Comedy Special	Won	
Emmy Awards	2006	All Aboard! Rosie's Family Cruise	Outstanding Nonfiction Special	Nominated	
Kids' Choice Awards	1995	The Flintstones	Favorite Movie Actress	Won	
Kids' Choice Awards	2000	In recognition of self	Hall of Fame Award	Won	
Tony Award	2014	"For her commitment to arts education for New York City's public school children."	Isabelle Stevenson Award	Won	
Women in Film Crystal + Lucy Awards	2002	In recognition of her excellence and innovation in her creative works that have enhanced the perception of women through the medium of television.	Lucy Award	Won	
Queerty Awards	2024	In recognition of self	Icon Award	Won	

== Filmography ==
=== Television ===
Year	Title	Role	Notes
1986–87	Gimme a Break!	Maggie O'Brien	Cast member
1988–91	Stand-Up Spotlight	Host	Also producer
1992	Beverly Hills, 90210	Herself	Episode: "Destiny Rides Again"
1992	Stand By Your Man	Lorraine Popowski	6 episodes
1994	The Ren & Stimpy Show	Scout Leader	Voice, episode: "Eat My Cookies"
1994	Living Single	Sheri	Episode: "There's No Ship Like Kinship"
1995	Bless This House	Peg	Episode: "I Am Not My Sister's Keeper"
1995	The Larry Sanders Show	Herself	Episode: "Eight"
1996–2002	The Rosie O'Donnell Show	Host	Also producer/executive producer
1996	The Nanny	Cozette/Herself	2 episodes
1996	Night Stand with Dick Dietrick	Herself	Episode: "Is Bigger Better?"
1997	The Twilight of the Golds	Jackie	Television film
1997	Suddenly Susan	Herself	Episode: "The Ways and Means"
1997–2001	Spin City	Herself	Episode: "An Affair to Remember"
1998	Blue's Clues	Herself	Episode: "Blue's Birthday"
1998	Murphy Brown	Ann Marie Delany Secretary No. 92	Episode: "A Man and a Woman"; uncredited
1999	Jackie's Back	Herself	Cameo
1999	Time of Your Life	Archer Fitzwith's Receptionist	Episode: ""The Time She Came to New York"; uncredited
1999	Ally McBeal	Dr. Hooper	Episode: "Let's Dance"
2000, 2024	Who Wants to Be a Millionaire	Contestant	Walked away with $500,000 in May 2000, and $250,000 in July 2024.
2000	Third Watch	Paramedic	Episode: "Officer Involved"
2000	The Practice	Wedding Consultant	Episode: "Settling"
2002	Will & Grace	Bonnie	Episode: "Dyeing Is Easy, Comedy Is Hard"
2002	Survivor: Marquesas	Host	Episode: "The Reunion"
2003	Judging Amy	Judge Nancy Paul	Episode: "Judging Eric"
2005	Riding the Bus with My Sister	Beth Simon	Television film; also executive producer
2005	Queer as Folk	Loretta Pye	Recurring role
2005	All Aboard! Rosie's Family Cruise	Herself	Also executive producer
2005–11	Curb Your Enthusiasm	Herself	Recurring role
2006–07	The View	Moderator	
2006–08	Nip/Tuck	Dawn Budge	Recurring role
2008	Little Britain USA	Herself	Season 1, episode 1
2008	Rosie Live	Herself	Also executive producer
2008	Christmas in Rockefeller Center 2008	Herself	
2009	America	Dr. Maureen Brennan	Television film; also producer
2009–10	Drop Dead Diva	Judge Madeline Summers	4 episodes
2011	Who Do You Think You Are?	Herself	Episode: "Rosie O'Donnell"
2011	The Doc Club with Rosie O'Donnell	Host	
2011–12	The Rosie Show	Host	Also executive producer
2011–12	Web Therapy	Maxine DeMaine	Recurring role; 4 episodes
2012	Happily Divorced	Katy O'Grady	Episode: "Mother's Day"
2013	Bomb Girls	Dottie Shannon	Episode: "Something Fierce"
2013	Captain Jake and the Never Land Pirates	Bouncing Bumble Queen	Voice, episode: "Follow the Bouncing Bumble!"
2013	Smash	Herself	2 episodes
2013	Impractical Jokers	Herself	Episode: "Everything's Just Rosie"
2014–15	The View	Co-host	
2014–18	The Fosters	Rita Hendricks	Recurring role
2015	Rosie O'Donnell: A Heartfelt Stand Up	Herself	Stand-up comedy special on HBO
2015	Empire	Pepper O'Leary	Episode: "Sinned Against"
2016	Mom	Jeanine	2 episodes
2016	Match Game	Herself	Recurring panelist
2016	Hairspray Live!	The Gym Teacher	TV special
2016–19	The $100,000 Pyramid	Herself	3 episodes
2017	When We Rise	Del Martin	2 episodes
2017	Difficult People	Vanessa	Episode: "Code Change"
2017–19	American Dad!	Townie	Voice, 2 episodes
2017–19	SMILF	Tutu	Main cast; 18 episodes
2020	I Know This Much Is True	Lisa Sheffer	Main cast; 5 episodes
2021	Run the World	Dr. Nancy Josephson	Episode: "My Therapist Says..."
2021	The L Word: Generation Q	Carrie	4 episodes
2022	Russian Doll	Subway Announcer	Voice, 6 episodes
2022	A League of Their Own	Vi	Episode: "Stealing Home"
2022	American Gigolo	Detective Sunday	Main cast
2025	And Just Like That...	Mary	Episode: "Outlook Good" (Season 3, Episode 1)
2025	Hacks	Herself	Episode: "Mrs. Table" (Season 4, Episode 6)

=== Film ===
Year	Title	Role	Notes
1992	A League of Their Own	Doris Murphy	
1993	Sleepless in Seattle	Becky	
1993	Another Stakeout	A.D.A. Gina Garrett	
1993	Fatal Instinct	The Pet Shop Lady	
1994	Car 54, Where Are You?	Lucille Toody	
1994	I'll Do Anything	Make-Up Person	
1994	The Flintstones	Betty Rubble	
1994	Exit to Eden	Sheila Kingston	
1995	Now and Then	Roberta Martin	
1995	Beautiful Girls	Gina Barrisano	
1996	Harriet the Spy	Ole Golly	
1996	A Very Brady Sequel	Herself	Cameo
1998	Wide Awake	Sister Terry	
1999	Get Bruce	Herself	Documentary
1999	Tarzan	Terk	Voice
2000	The Flintstones in Viva Rock Vegas	Octopus	Voice
2001	Artists and Orphans: A True Drama	Narrator	
2001	Hedwig and the Angry Inch	Herself	Archive footage
2001	The Party's Over	Herself	Documentary
2005	The Lady in Question is Charles Busch	Herself	Documentary
2005	ShowBusiness: The Road to Broadway	Herself	Documentary
2005	Pursuit of Equality	Herself	Documentary
2006	All Aboard! Rosie's Family Cruise	Herself	Documentary; executive producer
2015	Pitch Perfect 2	The View Host	

=== Web series ===
Year	Title	Role	Notes
2025	Battle for Dream Island	Spool	Voice, 3 episodes, credited as "Clay's Mom"

=== Award ceremonies ===
- Nickelodeon Kids' Choice Awards (Host) (1996–2003)
- 54th Annual Tony Awards (Host) (2000)
- 41st Annual Grammy Awards (Host) (1999)
- 42nd Annual Grammy Awards (Host) (2000)

=== Radio ===
- Rosie Radio SIRIUS XM (2009–11)

=== Theater ===
- Grease (1994) as Betty Rizzo at the Eugene O'Neill Theater
- Seussical (2001) as the Cat in the Hat (replacement for David Shiner)
- Pippin (2004) (World AIDS Day benefit concert)
- Fiddler on the Roof (2004) (replacement for Andrea Martin in 2005) as Golde
- No, No, Nanette (2008) (for Encores!)
- Love, Loss, and What I Wore (2009)
- Good for Otto by David Rabe (Off-Broadway, 2018), left production prior to opening due to illness
- The Music Man (the Kennedy Center, 2019) as Mrs. Paroo

== Bibliography ==
- Bosom Buddies: Lessons and Laughter on Breast Health and Cancer (1999), with Deborah Axelrod
- Find Me (2002)
- Celebrity Detox (2007)
- Rosie O'Donnell's Crafty U: 100 Easy Projects the Whole Family Can Enjoy All Year Long (2008)

=== Children's books ===
- Kids are Punny: Jokes Sent by Kids to the Rosie O'Donnell Show (1997)
- Kids are Punny 2: More Jokes Sent by Kids to the Rosie O'Donnell Show (1998)

== Discography ==
Year	Album	Chart positions	
Year	Album	US Holiday	US
1999	A Rosie Christmas	1	20
2000	Another Rosie Christmas	3	45

Year	Single	US Country	Album
2000	"Santa on the Rooftop" (with Trisha Yearwood)	72	A Rosie Christmas

== See also ==
- LGBT culture in New York City
- List of LGBT people from New York City
- NYC Pride March

Media offices
Preceded by Star Jones; Meredith Vieira	The View co-host 2006–2007	Succeeded by Whoopi Goldberg
Preceded by Jenny McCarthy; Sherri Shepherd; Barbara Walters	The View co-host 2014–2015	Succeeded by Raven-Symoné
