= Popcorn seasoning =

Ingredients used to flavor popcorn

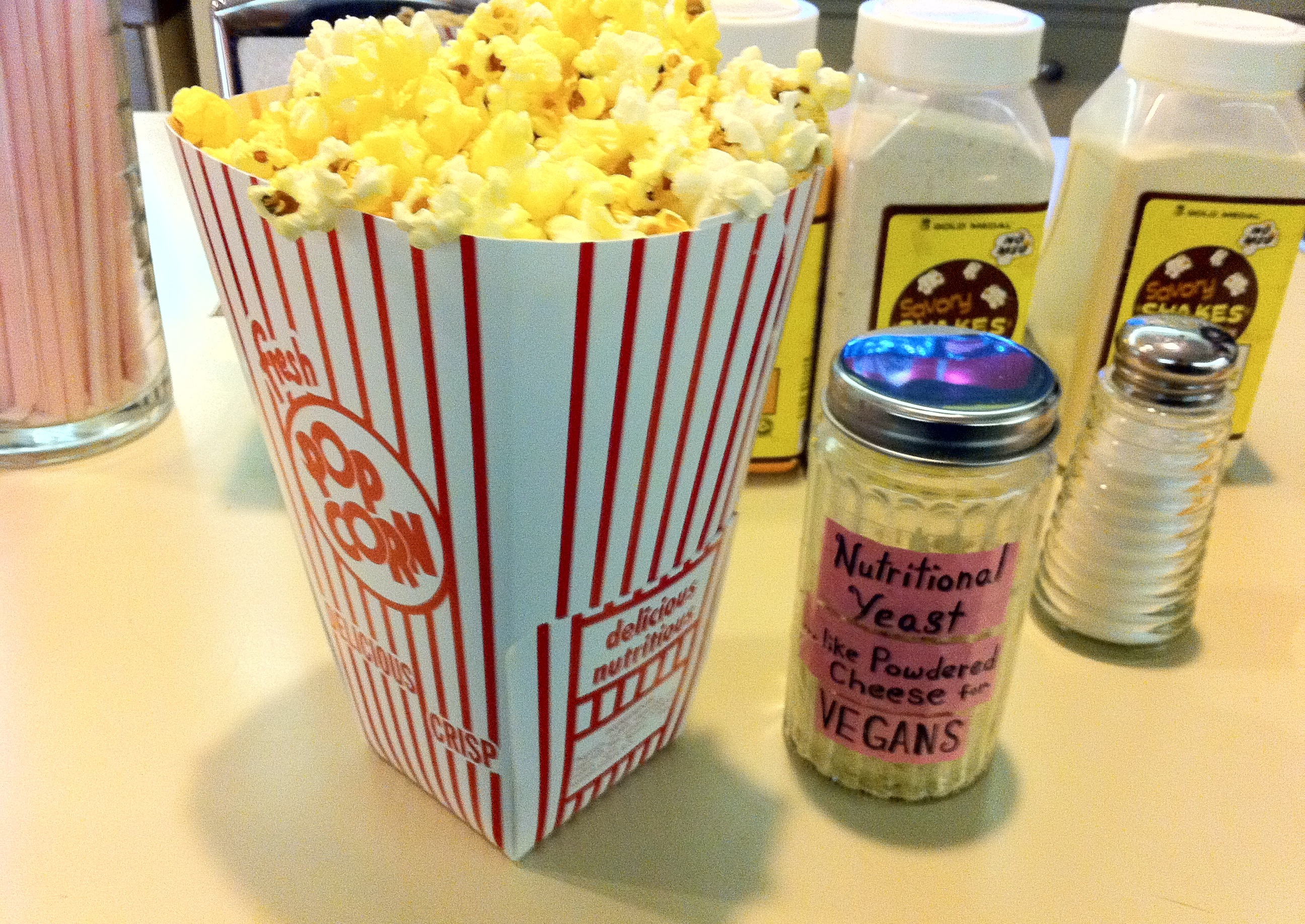
The Plaza Theatre in Atlanta offers visitors nutritional yeast for popcorn seasoning.

Popcorn seasoning is any ingredient used to add flavor to popcorn. In the United States, popcorn seasoning is mass-produced by several companies for commercial and consumer use. Popcorn seasonings may be used to enhance the flavor of popcorn, and some are used to add a buttery flavor to popcorn. Significant amounts are often used to ensure the adequate flavoring of popcorn, due to popcorn's low density. It is also sometimes utilized to add coloring to popcorn. Some popcorn seasoning may contain monosodium glutamate. Some specialty products exist in unique flavors, such as chocolate and bubble gum. Some popcorn seasoning products may be referred to as popcorn salt.

Some oils used to cook popcorn contain popcorn seasonings mixed within the oil, and may be referred to as popcorn seasoning oils or liquid popcorn seasoning.

Since the 1960s, American movie theaters have commonly used the seasoning Flavacol, made up of salt, butter flavoring, and artificial colors, to enhance their popcorn.

== Formulation ==
Dry popcorn seasoning may be finely granulated to enable even dispersion when placed upon popcorn. Common homemade popcorn seasoning ingredients include salt and melted butter.

Popcorn seasoning is sometimes used within machines that are utilized to produce large quantities of popcorn for consumer purchase.

In the 1950s in the United States, many commercial oil-based popcorn seasonings were produced with a coconut oil base, and also utilized artificial coloring.

== See also ==
- Condiment
- List of dried foods
- List of spice mixes
- Molly McButter
