= Tension myositis syndrome =

Pseudomedical diagnosis

Pseudomedical diagnosis
- Risks: Nocebo

Tension myositis syndrome (TMS), also known as tension myoneural syndrome or mindbody syndrome, is a name given by John E. Sarno to what he claimed was a condition of psychogenic musculoskeletal and nerve symptoms, most notably back pain. Sarno described TMS in four books, and stated that the condition may be involved in other pain disorders as well. The treatment protocol for TMS includes education, writing about emotional issues, resumption of a normal lifestyle and, for some patients, support meetings and/or psychotherapy.

The TMS diagnosis and treatment protocol are not accepted by the mainstream medical community.

== Conceptual basis ==
According to Sarno, TMS is a condition in which unconscious emotional issues (primarily rage, though other practitioners include other subconscious emotional issues such as anxiety, trauma, and fear) initiate a process that causes physical pain and other symptoms. His theory suggests that the unconscious mind uses the autonomic nervous system to decrease blood flow to muscles, nerves or tendons, resulting in oxygen deprivation (temporary micro-ischemia) and metabolite accumulation, experienced as pain in the affected tissues. Sarno suggested that the movement of back pain reported by patients—shifting up and down the spine or from side to side—indicates that the pain may not be the result of a physical deformity or injury.

Sarno stated that the underlying cause of the pain is the mind's defense mechanism against unconscious stress and emotions such as anger, anxiety, and narcissistic rage. The conscious mind is distracted by the physical pain, as the psychological repression process keeps the anger and rage contained in the unconscious and thereby prevented from entering conscious awareness. Sarno believed that when patients recognize that the symptoms are only a distraction, the symptoms then serve no purpose and subsequently go away. TMS can be considered a psychosomatic condition and has been referred to as a "distraction pain syndrome."

Sarno was a vocal critic of conventional medicine with regard to the diagnosis and treatment of back pain, which is often treated by rest, physical therapy, exercise, and/or surgery.

== Symptoms ==
Back pain is frequently mentioned as a TMS symptom, but Sarno defined TMS symptoms much more broadly:

- Symptom type: TMS symptoms include pain, stiffness, weakness, tingling, numbness, muscle contractures, cramps and other negative sensations, according to Sarno.
- Symptom location: In addition to the back, Sarno stated that TMS symptoms can occur in the neck, knee, arms, wrists, and other parts of the body. Schechter states that the symptoms have a tendency to move to other parts of the body. He considers symptom movement an important indicator that the pain is from TMS.

== Diagnosis ==
Below is a list of criteria for diagnosing TMS, according to Schechter and Sarno:

- Lack of known physical cause: Schechter and Sarno state that a physical examination, tests, and imaging studies are needed to rule out serious conditions, such as tumors. Sarno considers spinal disc herniations to generally be harmless because he says the symptom location does not even correlate to the herniation location.
- Tender points: While medical doctors use eleven of eighteen tender points as diagnostic criteria for fibromyalgia, Sarno states that he uses six main tender points to diagnose TMS: two tender points in the upper trapezius muscles, two in the lumbar paraspinal muscles and two in the lateral upper buttocks. He states that these are found in 99% of TMS patients.
- History of other psychosomatic disorders: Schechter and Sarno consider a prior history of other psychosomatic disorders an indication that the patient may have TMS. They list irritable bowel syndrome and tension headache as examples of psychosomatic disorders.

Schechter and Sarno state that if a patient is unable to visit a medical doctor who is trained in TMS, then the patient should see a traditional medical doctor to rule out serious disorders, such as fractures, tumors and infections.

== Treatment ==
Sarno recommended ignoring chronic muscular-skeletal pain and living everyday life as if there was none.

== Notable patients ==
Notable people who have been treated for TMS include the following:

- Radio personality Howard Stern credited TMS treatment with the relief of his "excruciating back and shoulder pain", as well as his obsessive-compulsive disorder.
- 20/20 co-anchor John Stossel was treated by Sarno for his chronic debilitating back pain. In a 20/20 segment on his former doctor, Stossel stated his opinion that the TMS treatment "cured" his back pain, although he admitted that he continues to have relapses of pain.
- Television writer and producer Janette Barber said that for three years, she had been increasingly unable to walk and eventually began to use a wheelchair due to severe ankle pain initially diagnosed as tendinitis. She was later diagnosed and treated for TMS. According to Barber, she was "pain-free one week after [Sarno's] lecture" and able to walk and run within a few months, notwithstanding her "occasional" relapses of pain.
- The late actress Anne Bancroft said that she saw several doctors for back pain, but only Sarno's TMS treatment helped her.
- The acclaimed filmmaker Terry Zwigoff said he was on the verge of suicide due to his debilitating back pain until he turned in desperation to Sarno's method; it "saved [his] life" as well as the life of a woman he told about it.
- Current Golden State Warriors head coach Steve Kerr revealed that he sought treatment for TMS to manage pain stemming from a back injury that he suffered in 2015.

== Reception ==
The mainstream medical community does not accept the TMS diagnosis and treatment protocol. Sarno himself stated in a 2004 interview with Medscape Orthopaedics & Sports Medicine that "99.999% of the medical profession does not accept this diagnosis." Although most physicians do not accept the validity of TMS, some do. Andrew Weil, an alternative medicine proponent, endorses TMS treatment for back pain. Mehmet Oz, the Republican administrator of the U.S. Centers for Medicare & Medicaid Services during the second Trump administration, a cardiothoracic surgeon (though non-practicing), and a former professor at Columbia University, includes TMS treatment in his four recommendations for treating back pain. Richard E. Sall, a physician who authored a book on worker's compensation, includes TMS in a list of conditions he considers possible causes of back pain resulting in missed work days that increase the costs of worker's compensation programs.

Patients typically see their doctor when the pain is at its worst, and pain chart scores statistically improve over time, even if left untreated; most people recover from an episode of back pain within weeks without any medical intervention. The TMS theory has also been criticized as too simplistic to account for the complexity of pain syndromes. James Rainville, a physician at New England Baptist Hospital, said that while TMS treatment works for some patients, Sarno mistakenly uses the TMS diagnosis for other patients who have real physical problems.
