= Helene Macaulay =

Helene Macaulay (born January 21, 1961) is an American celebrity makeup artist. She grew up in the Town of Tonawanda, a suburb of Buffalo, New York, and moved to New York City in 1979. She is related to the essayist, poet and British MP Thomas Babington Macaulay, Zachary Macaulay, the historian G.M. Trevelyan and the British novelist Rose Macaulay. She is of Scottish and Italian ancestry.

== Career ==
As a teenager Macaulay studied dance with Karel Shook and Arthur Mitchell of the Dance Theatre of Harlem, Judith Jamison of Alvin Ailey, and Peter Martins of the New York City Ballet. She is an alumna of the New York State Summer School for the Arts. In 1985, she moved to Milan to work on her portfolio, returned to New York City two years later. She occasionally does editorial work for Vanity Fair, Allure, and InStyle.

In addition to her work in the beauty industry, Helene is an actor, radio talk show co-host, writer, director and producer of film and theater. She and her brother Gavin Macaulay co-directed and produced the documentaries Frankie's Mambo: El Ritmo Diablo, and Chema's House both of which premiered on PBS in September 2005.

Also in 2005, Helene and Gavin began working on their third documentary, Hauling Trash. Helene is featured in an interview about the film in MORE magazine's "Firsts at 40" piece in the December 2006 issue. Macaulay can be heard on Rosie Radio with Rosie O'Donnell. She has a blog named The DailyGloss.

== The blog ==
In March 2007, Rosie O'Donnell began creating video blogs for her website. She made the video blogs while getting her hair and makeup done by Helene in preparation for going on-air for the television show The View. As readers began submitting questions directed towards or about Helene, she became a regular contributor to Rosie's video blog. Several weeks later, the duo was joined by Rosie's producer Janette Barber, and the trio are collectively referred to as Jahero.
