= Nutritional yeast =

Type of deactivated yeast

Large-flake nutritional yeast (fortified)
Nutritional value per 15 g
- Energy: 250 kJ (60 kcal)
- Carbohydrates: 5 g
- Sugars: 0 g
- Dietary fibre: 3 g
- Fat: 0.5 g
- Protein: 8 g
Vitamins and minerals
Vitamins	Quantity %DV^{†}
Thiamine (B1)	992% 11.9 mg
Riboflavin (B2)	754% 9.8 mg
Niacin (B3)	288% 46 mg
Vitamin B6	347% 5.9 mg
Vitamin B12	733% 17.6 μg
Minerals	Quantity %DV^{†}
Calcium	0% 6 mg
Iron	6% 1 mg
Potassium	1% 25 mg
Sodium	1% 25 mg
- Other constituents: Quantity
- Cholesterol: 0 mg
- Bob's Red Mill brand, manufacturer reported values. See also SR LEGACY data for yeast (active dry #1103594) for an idea about pre-fortification values and nutrients not reported above. SR surveys are performed by unbiased USDA personnel.
- ^{†}Percentages estimated using US recommendations for adults, except for potassium, which is estimated based on expert recommendation from the National Academies.

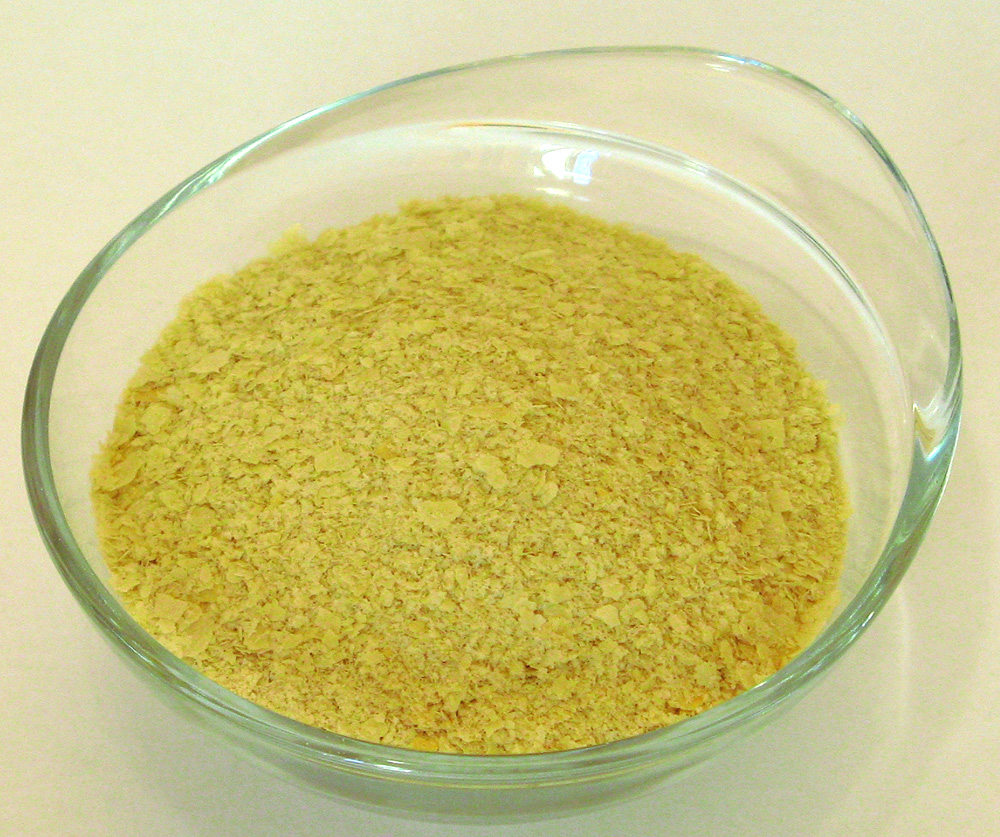
Nutritional yeast flakes

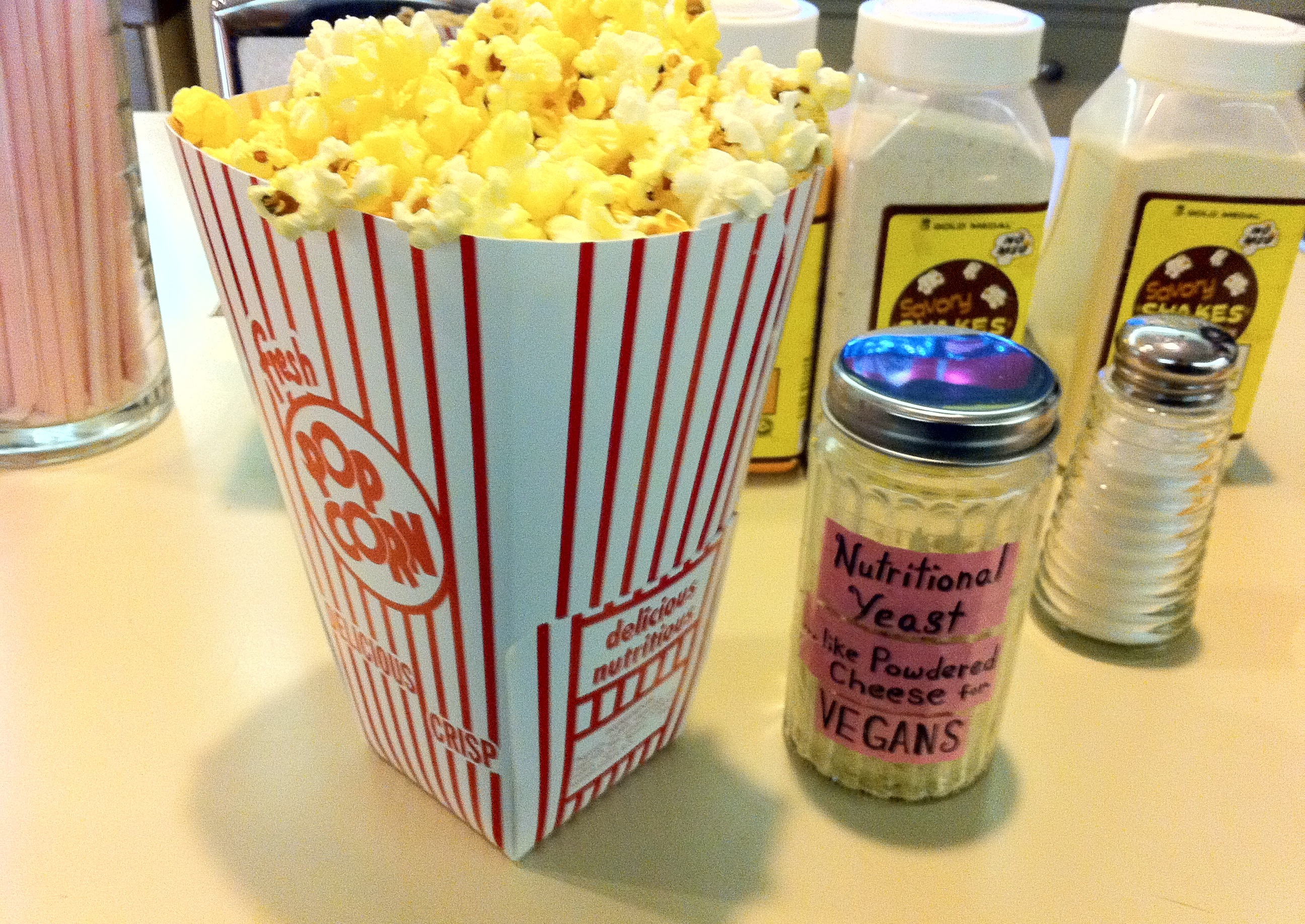
Some theatres offer visitors nutritional yeast for popcorn seasoning.

Nutritional yeast (informally called nooch) is a deactivated (i.e., dead) yeast, often a strain of Saccharomyces cerevisiae, that is sold commercially as a food product. It is sold in the form of yellow flakes, granules, or powder, and may be found in the bulk aisle of natural food stores. It is used in vegan and vegetarian cooking as an ingredient in recipes or as a condiment.

It is a source of some B-complex vitamins and contains trace amounts of several other vitamins and minerals. It is often fortified with vitamin B_{12}.

Nutritional yeast has a strong flavor described as nutty or cheesy for use as a cheese substitute. It may be used in preparation of mashed potatoes, tofu, or popcorn.

Nutritional yeast is a whole-cell inactive yeast that contains both soluble and insoluble parts, which is different from yeast extract. Yeast extract is made by centrifuging inactive nutritional yeast and concentrating the water-soluble yeast cell proteins which are rich in glutamic acid, nucleotides, and peptides, the flavor compounds responsible for umami taste.

Nutritional yeast was first marketed in the United States in 1950 by the Red Star brand. When vegetarianism became more popular in the 1960s and 1970s, the popularity of nutritional yeast also grew, with companies such as Bob’s Red Mill emphasizing the product’s vitamin content.

== Commercial production ==
Nutritional yeast is produced by culturing yeast in a nutrient medium for several days. The primary ingredient in the growth medium is glucose, often from either sugarcane or beet molasses. When the yeast is ready, it is killed with heat and then harvested, washed, dried and packaged. The species of yeast used is often a strain of Saccharomyces cerevisiae (the species commonly known as baker's yeast). The strains are cultured and selected for desirable characteristics and often exhibit a different phenotype from strains of S. cerevisiae used in baking and brewing.

== Nutrition ==
In a reference amount of 15 g (0.53 oz), one manufactured, fortified brand is 33% carbohydrates, 53% protein, and 3% fat, providing 60 calories. Levels of B vitamins in the reference amount are multiples of the Daily Value.

Nutritional yeast contains low amounts of dietary minerals, unless fortified.

There may be confusion about the source of vitamin B_{12} in nutritional yeast, as yeast cannot produce B_{12}, which is naturally produced only by some bacteria. When it is fortified, the vitamin B_{12} (commonly cyanocobalamin) is produced separately and then added to the yeast.

== See also ==
- Torula, another yeast used for its savory flavor
- Marmite
- Vegan cheese
- Vegemite
