= Edward M. Kopko =

American businessman

- Kopko Addressing at NYSE
- Education: University of Connecticut (B.A.); Columbia University (M.A.)
- Occupations: CEO, Publisher, Bold Business CEO, Mercury Z
- Website: edkopko.com

Edward M. Kopko is an American businessman, publisher and author. He is chief executive officer of Mercury Z, a network engineering company, and chief executive officer of Bold Business, a global media and technology company. He is the author of the book "Project Bold Life: The Proven Formula to Take on Challenges and Achieve Happiness and Success."

== Early life, education, and family ==
Kopko was born in Norwich, Connecticut. He grew up in Uncasville, CT, and graduated from Montville High School (Connecticut). He resides in St. Petersburg, Florida. He holds a bachelor's of arts degree in economics from the University of Connecticut and an master's of arts degree in economics from Columbia University.

== Career ==
Kopko was the chairman and chief executive officer and publisher of CE Group and Chief Executive Magazine from 1993 to 2009.

Kopko was president and chief executive officer of Butler International, a worldwide provider of technical and technology services, from 1987 to March 2009.

Kopko is editor of the "Best and Worst States" website, which provides information and facts about the best and worst aspects of individual American states.

Kopko is a member of the Board of Trustees of the Foundation for Economic Education, a libertarian think-tank.

Kopko received the Ellis Island Medal of Honor in 1999 from the National Ethnic Coalition. Kopko received the Award of Merit for Corporate Responsibility and Volunteerism in 2001 from the Bergen Community College Foundation. Kopko served as a trustee of the Committee for Economic Development, a nonprofit, nonpartisan, business-led public policy organization that delivers well-researched analysis and reasoned solutions to our nation's most critical issues. Kopko served on the Board of Governors of Ramapo College from 1998 to 2002 and was a recipient of its Distinguished Citizens Award in 1997. In September 2019 Kopko received the Impact Award for extraordinary service supporting the diversity and inclusion movement from Diversity MBA magazine.

From 2001 to 2005, Kopko served as president of the board of trustees for the Helen Hayes Theatre Company, a not-for profit performing arts organization, based in Nyack, NY.
