= John E. Sarno =

American physician and academic

- Born: John Ernest Sarno Jr. June 23, 1923; Williamsburg, Brooklyn, New York, U.S.
- Died: June 22, 2017 (aged 93); Danbury, Connecticut, U.S.
- Education: Columbia University College of Physicians and Surgeons
- Known for: Tension Myoneural Syndrome (formerly Tension Myositis Syndrome)
- Scientific career
- Fields: Rehabilitation medicine
- Workplaces: Rusk Institute at New York University Medical Center

John Ernest Sarno Jr. (June 23, 1923 – June 22, 2017) was Professor of Rehabilitation Medicine at New York University School of Medicine and an attending physician at the Howard A. Rusk Institute of Rehabilitation Medicine at New York University Medical Center. He graduated from Kalamazoo College in Kalamazoo, Michigan, in 1943, and the Columbia University College of Physicians and Surgeons in 1950. In 1965, he was appointed the director of the outpatient department at the Rusk Institute.

Sarno originated the term tension myositis syndrome (TMS) to name a claimed psychosomatic condition producing pain—particularly back pain. The syndrome's diagnosis and treatment protocol are not accepted by the mainstream medical community. He conducted no studies to verify his claim of an 85% cure rate.

In 2016, a documentary was released by the independent film studio Rumur. The film includes interviews with Sarno as well as with Larry David, Howard Stern, Andrew Weil, and others. The film was selected for several notable film festivals.

== Biography ==
Sarno graduated from Newtown High School at age 16. He repeated senior year and graduated again from the private Horace Mann School in the Bronx. In 1943, he joined the army and worked in field hospitals in Europe during World War II.

Sarno married Penny Patt. They had three children: Lindianne, David Jon, and John Laurence. They divorced in 1966. He remarried in 1967; this time to Martha Lamarque, a colleague at the Rusk Institute. They had one daughter, Christina.

== Tension myositis syndrome ==
Sarno's most notable achievement is the development, diagnosis, and treatment of tension myoneural syndrome (TMS), which is currently not accepted by mainstream medicine. According to Sarno, TMS is a psychosomatic illness causing chronic back, neck, and limb pain that is not relieved by standard medical treatments. He includes other ailments, such as gastrointestinal problems, dermatological disorders, and repetitive-strain injuries, as TMS-related. Sarno states that he has successfully treated over ten thousand patients at the Rusk Institute by educating them on his beliefs of a psychological and emotional basis to their pain and symptoms. Sarno's theory is, in part, that the pain or other symptoms are an unconscious "distraction" to aid in the repression of deep unconscious emotional issues. Sarno believes that when patients think about what may be upsetting them in their unconscious, they can defeat their mind's strategy to repress these powerful emotions; when the symptoms are seen for what they are, the symptoms then serve no purpose and go away. Supporters of Sarno's work hypothesize an inherent difficulty in performing the clinical trials needed to prove or disprove the diagnosis since it is difficult to conduct clinical trials on psychosomatic illnesses.

== Bibliography ==
- Sarno, John E. (1982). Mind Over Back Pain. Berkley Trade. ISBN 0-425-08741-7.
- Sarno, John E. (1991). Healing Back Pain: The Mind–Body Connection. Grand Central Publishing. ISBN 0-446-39230-8.
- Sarno, John E. (1998). The Mindbody Prescription: Healing the Body, Healing the Pain. Warner Books. ISBN 0-446-67515-6.
- Sarno, John E. (2006). The Divided Mind: The Epidemic of Mindbody Disorders. Harper Paperbacks. ISBN 0-06-085178-3.
