= Celebrity Detox =

2007 memoir by Rosie O'Donnell

Celebrity Detox: The Fame Game
- First edition
- Author: Rosie O'Donnell
- Language: English
- Genre: Memoir
- Published: October 9, 2007
- Publisher: Grand Central Publishing
- Publication place: United States
- ISBN: 978-0446582247

Celebrity Detox: The Fame Game is the second memoir written by comedian, actress, and talk show host Rosie O'Donnell. Focusing on her departure from The Rosie O'Donnell Show and later The View, O'Donnell expresses the struggles associated with the almost drug-like concept of fame. The book especially touches on the rift between O'Donnell and Barbara Walters that occurred after O'Donnell publicly berated Donald Trump on the air. Due to editing changes, the book was released in October though it was originally scheduled to be released on September 18. The book debuted at #5 on the New York Times bestselling non-fiction list.

It follows O'Donnell's first memoir, Find Me, published in 2002.

All of Rosie's profits will go to Rosie's Broadway Kids.
