= Molly McButter =

American butter alternative

Molly McButter is an American-made flavored butter substitute manufactured by B&G Foods. Originally developed by food chemists at Alberto-Culver, it is a lower-calorie replacement for butter.

As a result of its partially hydrogenated oil ingredient, Molly McButter contains trans fat.

== History ==
In a 1989 evaluation by Consumer Reports, food scientists and taste-testers found that Molly McButter had a butter-like flavor with slight dairy notes, but also had a chemical taste and was notably saltier than butter. The study also revealed that Molly McButter was significantly more expensive than butter, and had the highest sodium content among the butter substitutes tested, with nearly three times more than one of its competitors.

As of 1990, Molly McButter was available in butter, cheese, and sour cream flavors.

In 1993, The Ladies' Home Journal ran a contest in which readers submitted recipes they had created using Molly McButter, with the winner to receive a new kitchen appliance and a cash award.

By 2009, Molly McButter and Mrs. Dash Seasoning Blends (also owned by B&G) worked with the Idaho Potato Commission, an agency of the state of Idaho, to promote retail sales of potatoes to consumers. The partnership sponsored an Idaho Potato Retail Display Contest, scheduled to coincide with Potato Lovers Month, in which retailers competed for prizes including a cash award.

== See also ==
- Popcorn seasoning
