= Deborah Axelrod =

American surgeon

Dr. Deborah Axelrod
- Born: August 31, 1957 (age 69)
- Occupations: Surgeon, Professor of Surgery
- Employer: NYU
- Spouse: Noel Raskin, M.D.
- Website: www.breastdoc.org

Deborah M. Axelrod is an American surgeon who specializes in breast cancer.

== Education ==
Axelrod earned her undergraduate degree in chemistry at University of Pennsylvania, then earned her MD at Tel Aviv University in 1982, then did residencies at Mount Sinai Beth Israel and a fellowship at Memorial Sloan Kettering Cancer Center. She worked at Mount Sinai and Saint Vincent's Catholic Medical Center before joining NYU in 2004.

== Career ==
Axelrod is on the board of directors for several cancer support organizations and works to educate the public about breast cancer, including an ongoing program in the Arab American community. She is Director of Clinical Breast Programs and Services and Medical Director of Community Cancer Education and Outreach at NYU Langone Medical Center.

== Selected works ==
- O'Donnell, Rosie; Axelrod, Deborah; Semler, Tracy Chutorian (1999). Bosom buddies : lessons and laughter on breast health and cancer. New York, NY: Warner Books. ISBN 978-0446676205.
- Kim, JT; Wajda, M; Cuff, G; Serota, D; Schlame, M; Axelrod, DM; Guth, AA; Bekker, AY (December 2006). "Evaluation of aromatherapy in treating postoperative pain: pilot study". Pain Practice. 6 (4): 273–7. doi:10.1111/j.1533-2500.2006.00095.x. PMID 17129308. S2CID 13573738.
- Marti, JL; Ayo, D; Levine, P; Hernandez, O; Rescigno, J; Axelrod, DM (2012). "Nonimage-guided fine needle aspiration biopsy of palpable axillary lymph nodes in breast cancer patients". The Breast Journal. 18 (1): 3–7. doi:10.1111/j.1524-4741.2011.01180.x. PMID 22098412. S2CID 28476970.
- Rose, RH; Axelrod, DM; Aldea, PA; Beck, AR (February 1988). "Colorectal carcinoma in the young. A case report and review of the literature". Clinical Pediatrics. 27 (2): 105–8. doi:10.1177/000992288802700208. PMID 2827929. S2CID 34575778.
- Axelrod, D; Burns, K; Davis, D; von Larebeke, N (2004). ""Hormesis"--an inappropriate extrapolation from the specific to the universal". International Journal of Occupational and Environmental Health. 10 (3): 335–9. doi:10.1179/oeh.2004.10.3.335. PMID 15473091. S2CID 27061451.
