= America (2009 film) =

- Genre: Drama
- Based on: America by E. R. Frank
- Written by: Joyce Eliason; Rosie O'Donnell
- Directed by: Yves Simoneau
- Starring: Rosie O'Donnell; Ruby Dee; Philip Johnson
- Music by: Normand Corbeil
- Country of origin: United States
- Original language: English

Production
- Producers: Rosie O'Donnell; David A. Rosemont; Larry Sanitsky
- Cinematography: John B. Aronson
- Editor: Richard Comeau
- Running time: 89 minutes
- Production companies: The Sanitsky Company; KidRo Productions; Sony Pictures Television

Original release
- Network: Lifetime
- Release: February 28, 2009

America is a 2009 American made-for-television drama film directed by Yves Simoneau and starring Rosie O'Donnell, Ruby Dee and Philip Johnson. It was written by Joyce Eliason. The film is based on the young adult novel America by E. R. Frank. It premiered on February 28, 2009, on Lifetime.

== Plot ==
A biracial 17-year-old boy named America, who has experienced a difficult life of foster care and sexual abuse, undergoes counseling with psychiatrist Maureen Brennan to help him come to terms with his painful past of childhood trauma, including growing up with and abandoned by a mother suffering from drug addiction and being shuffled through a series of foster homes including the Harpers. The film starts with Dr. Brennan at a group home where she is giving a small introduction about the outlook for most of the group home children's futures. A young America, emotionally vacant and suicidal, comes to the attention of Brennan. When Dr. Brennan tries to talk to America, he refuses to give her any answers about his childhood. Eventually Dr. Brennan helps him understand his troubled past in order to find the courage to move on and survive. Helps him to forgive and forget, in order to be able to move forward in life.

== Cast ==
- Philip Johnson as America
- Rosie O'Donnell as Dr. Maureen Brennan
- Ruby Dee as Mrs. Harper
- Tim Rhoze as Reggie Harper
- Toya Turner as America's Mother/Susana
- Raquel Castro as Liza
- Jade Yorker as Brooklyn
- Dante Brown as Young Brooklyn (6 years old)
- Michael Algieri as Young America (6 years old)
- Nikolas Zilafro as a Young Boy
- Logan Huffman as Marshall
- Shannon Riddick as Teen
- Kyle Clarington as Counselor
- Kojo Asiedu as Don
- Bubba Weiler as Fish
- Courtney Benjamin as Sheriff Romero
- David Aron Damane as Bobby Crisp
- Penny Gibbs as Social Worker
- Doug Hamilton as Judge
- Richard Goteri as Head Cook
- Dave Kilgore as Businessman (uncredited)
- Dalibor Stolevski as Cook (uncredited)

== Screening ==
America premiered on Lifetime Television on February 28, 2009 against critical acclaim and was repeated on March 1 and 3, 2009 on the same channel.

Its showing also led to public discussion about the system of foster care. Rosie O'Donnell explained the dilemma of "aging out of the foster care system" when young people in foster care are left out of the system when they reach 18 (21 in a few U.S. states), as all services are cut. O'Donnel; explains that most of these kids end up as homeless or in jail.

== DVD ==
The DVD of the film was released on September 1, 2009.

== America (2002 novel) ==
The film is based on America, a young adult novel written by E.R. Frank. It tells the story of America, a fifteen-year-old biracial boy who had gotten lost in the system. The author of the book, E.R. Frank, is herself a social worker. In an author's note at the end of the book, she says she has worked with many Americas over the years.
