= E. R. Frank =

American fiction writer, clinical social worker and psychotherapist

- Born: Richmond, Virginia, U.S.
- Education: Vassar College (AB, MSW)
- Occupations: Writer, social worker
- Writing career
- Period: 2000–present
- Genre: Children's fiction

E. R. Frank is an American fiction writer, clinical social worker and psychotherapist. She writes young adult or teen fiction, and middle-grade fiction.

Frank won the Teen People Book Club NEXT Award for her first novel Life Is Funny, which was published by DK Ink in 2000. Her 2003 novel America was made into a 2009 television movie starring Rosie O'Donnell and Philip Johnson.

Frank is the granddaughter of Gerold Frank, a best-selling American biographer and ghostwriter. She graduated from Vassar College in 1990.

As a therapist, Frank specializes in adults and adolescents who have undergone psychological trauma. According to a 2004 interview for Vassar's alumni publication, she "uses books, and discussion of literary characters" in her practice. She also told the interviewer, "Writing is therapeutic for me. It's how I process my experiences as a social worker."

Her book America was removed from public school libraries in Martin County, Florida.

== Books ==
- Life Is Funny (DK Ink, 2000)
- America (Atheneum Books, 2002)
- Friction (Atheneum, 2003) – middle-grade fiction
- Wrecked (Atheneum, 2007)
- Dime (2015)

== Awards ==
- Teen People Book Club NEXT Award, Life Is Funny
