= R Family Vacations =

LGBT vacation entertainment company

- Type: LGBTQ travel
- Industry: LGBT tourism
- Founded: 2003
- Headquarters: Nyack, New York, U.S.
- Key people: Gregg Kaminsky (co-founder); Kelli O'Donnell (co-founder); Rosie O'Donnell (creative input)
- Products: all-inclusive cruise-ship-based vacations, events, related products
- Website: rfamilyvacations.com

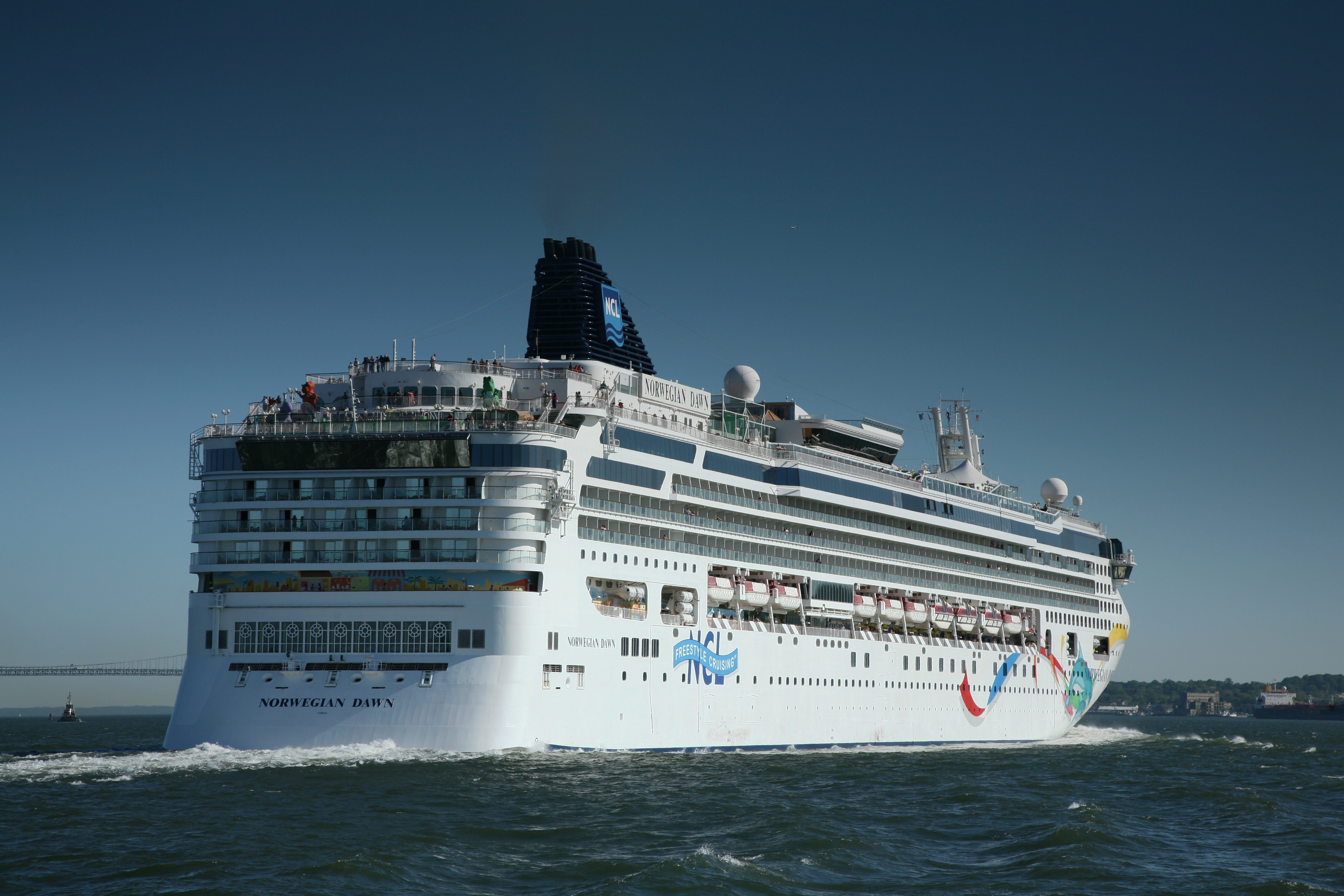
Norwegian Dawn, the de facto official ship of R Family Vacations.

R Family Vacations is an LGBTQ vacation entertainment company that provides luxury cruise ship trips with a focus on inclusive activities for children and services including same-sex marriage ceremonies. They are a subsidiary of Tzell Travel Group.

== History ==
In 2003, Rosie O'Donnell and her then partner Kelli Carpenter-O'Donnell partnered with travel entrepreneur Gregg Kaminsky to launch R Family Vacations catering to both gays and lesbians, "the very first all gay and lesbian family vacation packages" where "gays and lesbians can bring their kids, their friends, and their parents." O'Donnell is not involved on a day-to-day basis, but provides marketing and promotional advice and is credited with the idea for the company when she filled in as a last-minute replacement headliner on a gay cruise being promoted by Kaminsky.

=== Maiden voyage (2004) ===
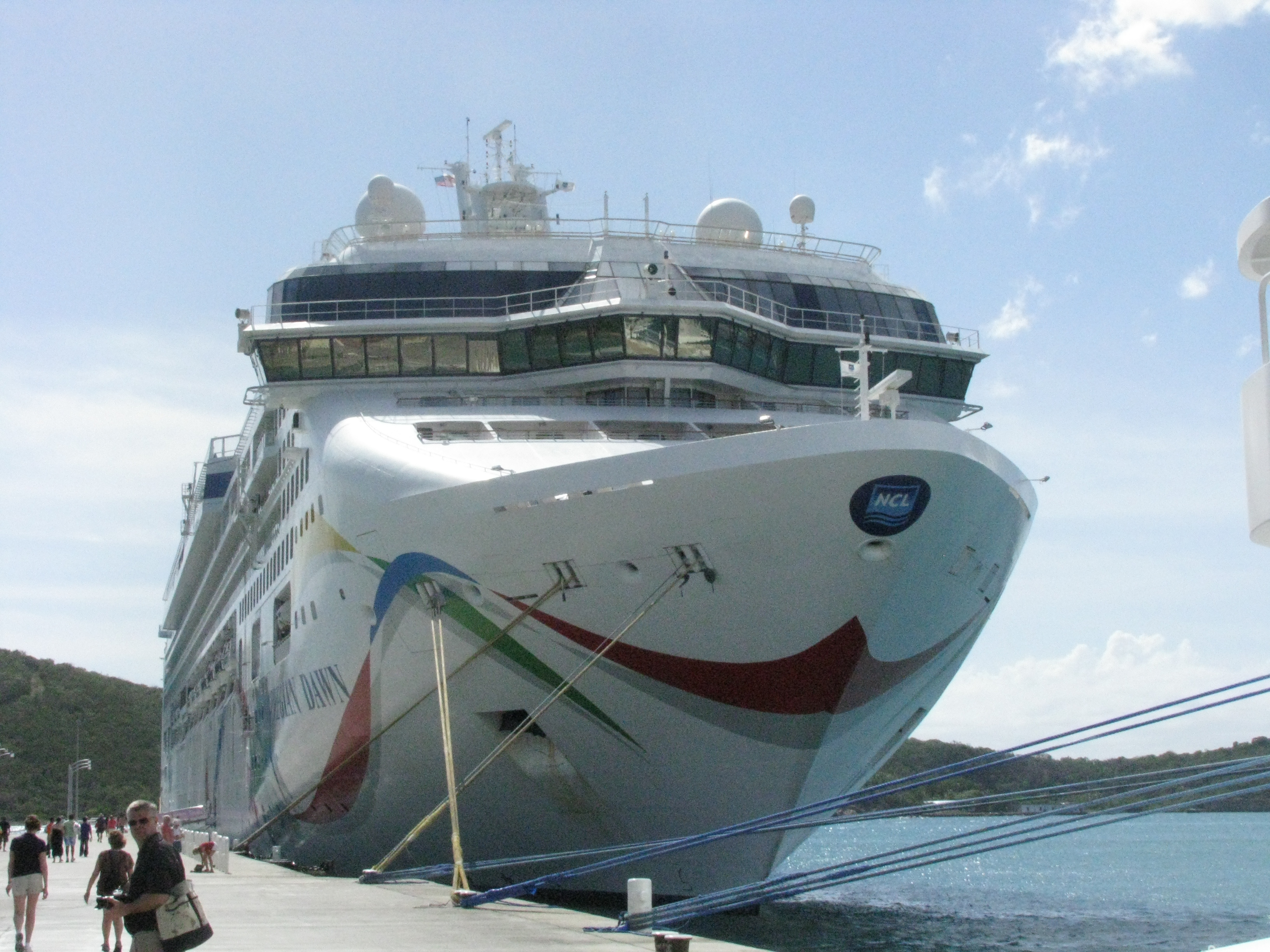
The Norwegian Dawn docked in Saint Thomas, US Virgin Islands.

On July 11, 2004, the first cruise was held aboard Norwegian Cruise Lines's Norwegian Dawn with 1600 passengers including 600 children. By the third year, the cruise was selling out to a maximum capacity of 2,600 passengers. In addition to traditional entertainment and recreational activities, the company partnered with Provincetown’s Family Pride, a 25-year-old Washington, D.C.–based organization that advocates for GLBT families, to host discussions on "adoption, insemination, surrogacy, and everything else that would be helpful to gay parenting. Metropolitan Community Church, the predominantly GLBT Christian denomination, had clergy on board to perform wedding ceremonies and conduct interfaith services and there was also discussion groups for kids and a panel discussion where teens could share their experiences of growing up with gay and lesbian parents.

=== 2007 ===
In 2007, the company considered making Bermuda one of its stops. Recalling a 2004 incident between Norwegian Cruise Lines' all gay cruises and Christian "protesters chanting anti-gay slogans" in Nassau, Bahamas, Kaminsky claimed that Bermuda, which he incorrectly believed had tourism as its main industry, would face economic repercussions if a similar event occurred in the British overseas territory, which has long held a reputation for being anti-gay and only the year before the local legislature refused to even consider outlawing sexuality-based discrimination. While the trip was supported by Premier and Minister of Tourism and Transportation Dr. Ewart Brown, it was opposed by one of his close political allies, Andre Curtis, the organiser of a controversial "Faith-Based Tourism" initiative, who organised some eighty churches into an interfaith group called "United by Faith" to oppose the planned visit alongside local African Methodist Episcopal churches. R Families decided to change the itinerary to replace Bermuda with two stops in Florida and a private island. Kaminsky stated

"If we didn't have kids on board and there were protesters, we would go, but we did not want to expose kids to that hatred while they were on vacation."

=== 2008 ===
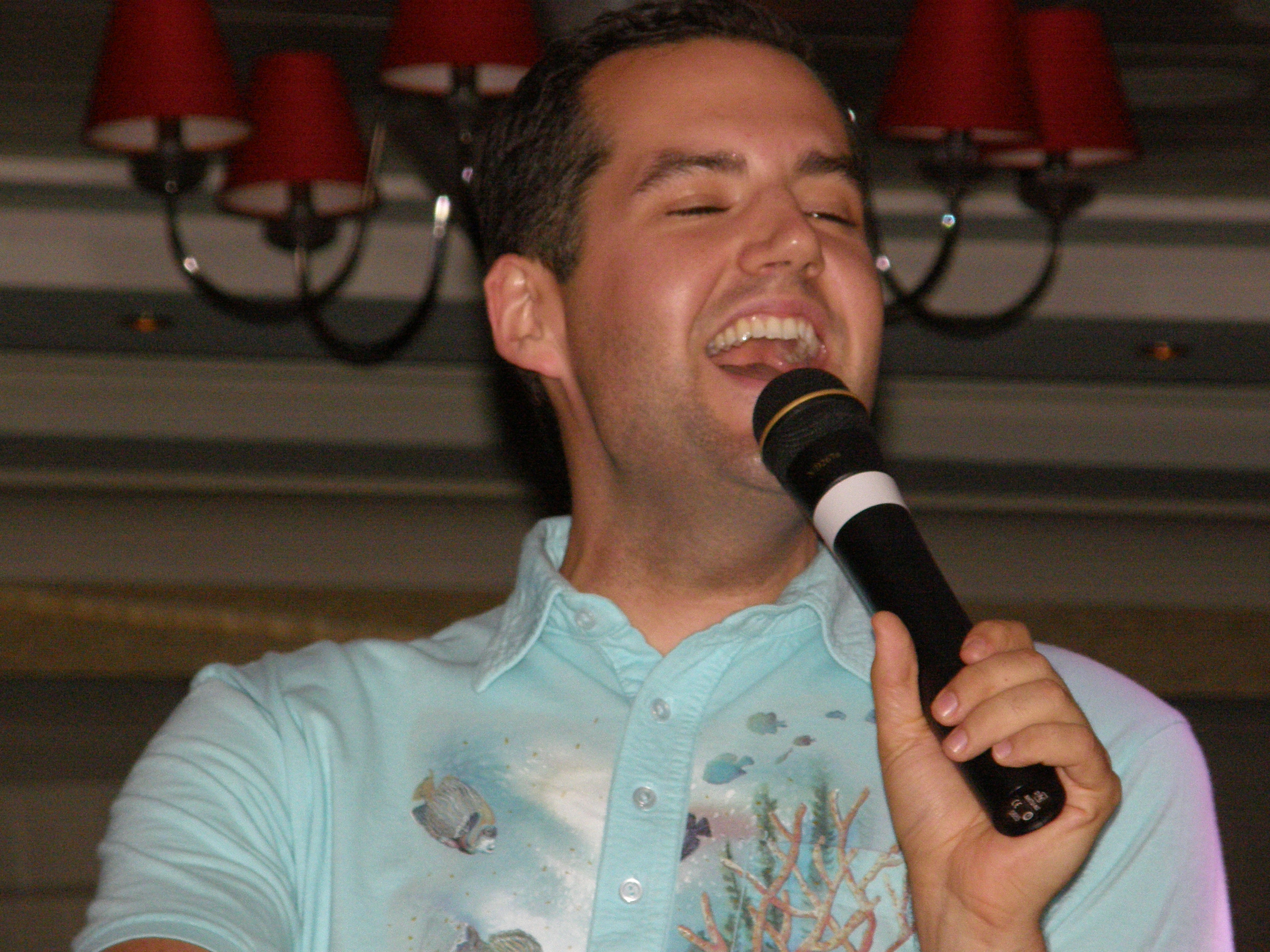
Ross Mathews singing karaoke on R Family Vacations cruise with Rosie O'Donnell, in July 2007.

In January 2008, Pink Pea, a production company, announced that "Dottie", "the star of Dottie's Magic Pockets—the first children's program for kids in gay and lesbian families" will be part of the entertainment. "Dottie", portrayed by actor Jen Plante, appeared on the cruise to the Mexican Riviera, March 15–22, 2008, and marked the first time the LGBT families and friends will be "entertained by the main character of a kids' show that is set in a lesbian household".

=== Later growth ===
The company expanded from cruises to include resort stays, adults-only vacations and a Broadway cruise. As of early 2020, the company had hosted more than twenty thousand guests on its excursions.

== All Aboard: Rosie's Family Cruise ==
A documentary film about the trip looked inside the lives of some of the 500 families that cruised from New York to the Bahamas. The documentary, All Aboard: Rosie's Family Cruise, debuted April 6, 2006, on HBO. The film was nominated for three Emmy Awards. Of the experience O'Donnell stated "We didn’t really realize the magic that was going to take place. People who had never met another gay family met other families and it was powerful."

== See also ==
- List of gay resort areas
- LGBT marketing
- LGBT tourism
- Olivia Travel
