= SV Rembrandt van Rijn =

Dutch-built schooner (launched 1924)

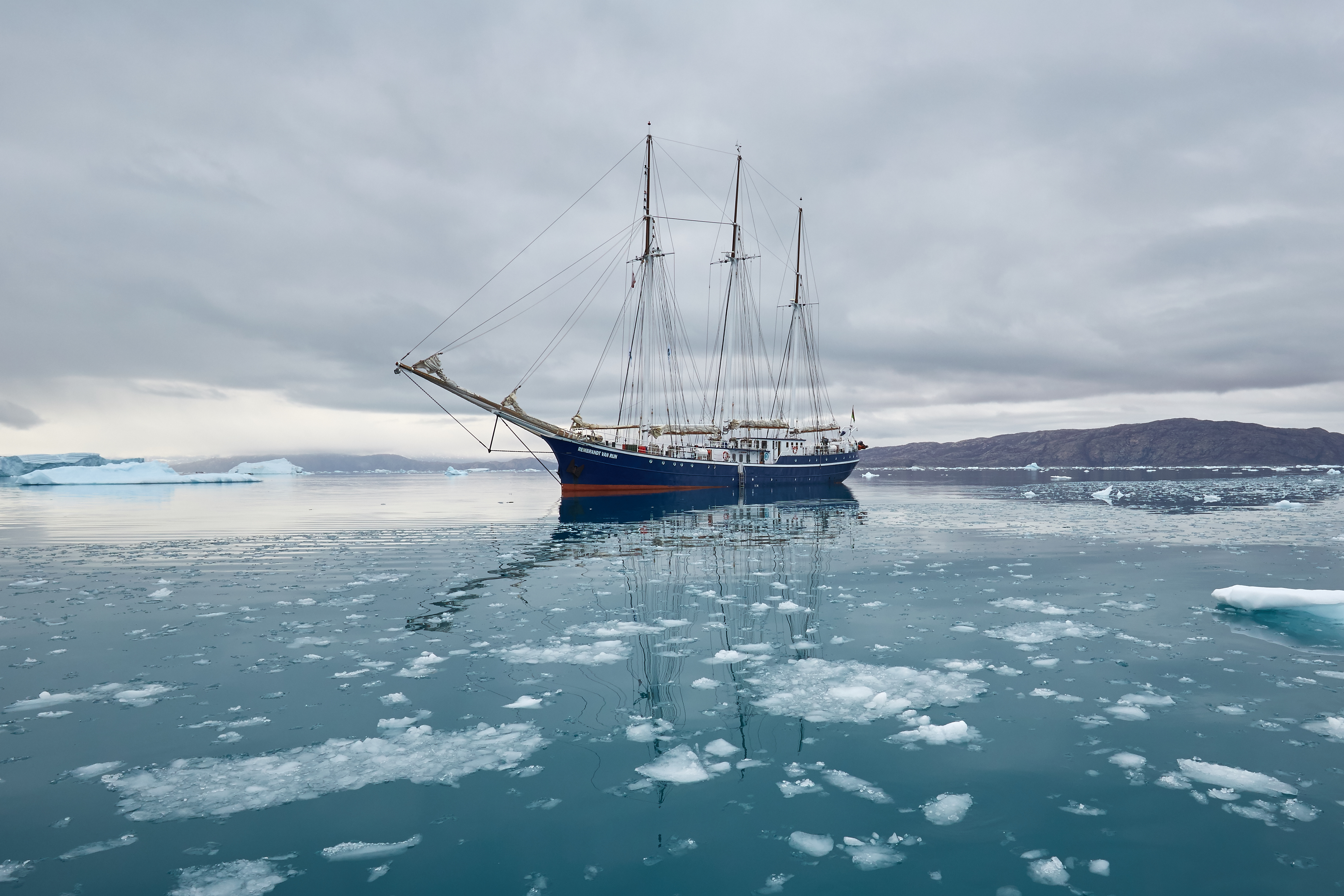
- Rembrandt van Rijn in Disko Bay, Greenland, in 2016

History
- Name: Jacoba (1924–28); Anna Marta (1928–62); Minde (1962–71); Klaus D (1971–85); Enno Doedens Star (1985–95); Rembrandt van Rijn (since 1995)
- Owner: Gebroeders Bloot, Katwijk (1924–28); Jagemann & Karstens (1928–29); R. Karstens (1929–52); Karstens & Pape (1952–62); H E Hansen (1962–71); A K Nielsen (1971–84); A M Tichelaar (1984–85); Stichting Werkgelegenheid Projecten (1985–98); Balder Nieuwland B.V. (since 1998)
- Operator: Gebroeders Bloot, Katwijk (1924–28); Jagemann & Karstens (1928–29); R. Karstens (1929–31); H Böse (1931–33); Heinscke & Co (1933–36); R. Karstens (1936–52); Karstens & Pape (1952–62); H E Hansen (1962–71); A K Nielsen (1971–84); A M Tichelaar (1984–85); Stichting Werkgelegenheid Projecten (1985–98); Oceanwide Nautical Services B.V. (since 1998)
- Port of registry: Katwijk, Netherlands (1924–28); Hamburg, Germany (1928–33); (Germany) Hamburg (1933–35); (Germany) Hamburg (1935–45); (Allied-occupied Germany) Hamburg (1945–49); Hamburg, West Germany (1949–62); Marstal, Denmark (1962–71); (Denmark) Egersund (1971–73); (Denmark) Broager (1973–85); (Netherlands) Leeuwarden (1985–86); (Netherlands) Groningen (1986–95); Panama City (1995–2011); Vanuatu (since 2011)
- Builder: Scheepswerf Gebroeders Boot, Leiderdorp, Netherlands
- Launched: November 1924
- Identification: Fishing registration KW146 (1924–28); Code letters RGPQ (1928–34); Code letters DJFI (1934–49); Code letters DGCL (1949–62); Code letters OZFX (1962–84); IMO number: 5235715 (late 1960s–99); IMO number: 8941808 (since 1999); Radio callsign 3FVE7 (1995–2011); Radio callsign YJRJ3 (since 2011); MMSI number: 576988000
- Status: in active service

General characteristics
- Class & type: Lugger (1924–28); Motor vessel (1928–34); Schooner (1934– ); Motor vessel ( –1993); Schooner (since 1993)
- Tonnage: 138 GRT, 78 NRT (1924–33); 174 GRT, 98 NRT (1933–39); 211 GRT, 135 NRT (1939–51); 272 GRT, 131 NRT, 350 DWT (1951–95); 307 GRT, 123 NRT, 350 DWT (since 1995)
- Displacement: 435 t
- Length: 29.21 metres (95 ft 10 in) (1924–34); 33.16 metres (108 ft 10 in) (1934–51); 42.55 metres (139 ft 7 in) (1951–95); 44.83 metres (147 ft 1 in) (since 1995)
- Beam: 6.65 metres (21 ft 10 in)
- Draught: 2.80 metres (9 ft 2 in)
- Depth: 3.59 metres (11 ft 9 in)
- Installed power: 2 x 740 horsepower (550 kW)
- Propulsion: Sails (1924–28); Diesel engine (1928–34); Sails and diesel engine (since 1934)
- Sail plan: Schooner
- Speed: 9 knots (17 km/h)
- Capacity: 33 passengers
- Complement: 12

Rembrandt van Rijn is a Vanuatu-flagged three-masted schooner currently employed for Arctic cruises by owner and operator Oceanwide Expeditions. She was built in 1924 as a fishing lugger and has served as a coaster and schooner under the flags of the Netherlands, Germany, Denmark, and Panama. The ship has been lengthened three times, fitted with four different engines, and has had a change of IMO number during her career on the seas.

== History ==
Rembrandt van Rijn was built in 1924 as the fishing lugger Jacoba by Gebroeders Boot, Leiderdorp, South Holland, Netherlands, for Gebr. Bloot, Katwijk, South Holland. She was launched in November of 1924. Her port of registry was Katwijk, and she was allocated the registration KW146. In 1929, Jacoba was sold to K.K. Jagemann and R.S. Karstens, Hamburg, Germany. She was converted to a motor vessel and was fitted with a diesel engine. Jacoba was then renamed Anna Marta, after which the code letters RGPQ were allocated. Her port of registry at the time was Hamburg.

On 18 September 1929, Anna Marta was sold to R.S. Karstens. From 1931 to April 1933, she was operated under the management of H. Böse, Altona, Germany. Management then passed to Heinscke & Co. In May 1933, a new diesel engine was fitted. In January 1934, her code letters were changed to DJFI. In March 1933, Anna Marta was lengthened and rebuilt as a three-masted schooner at Kiel. By 1937, Anna Marta was again operated by R. Karstens. She was rebuilt again in 1939.

In 1949, Anna Marta's code letters were changed to DGCL. In April 1951, she was lengthened at Stade, West Germany, and had a new engine in July. On 19 May 1952, Anna Marta was sold to M. Karstens and H. Pape, Hamburg, West Germany. Ownership passed to Karstens & Pape on 13 August 1954. Another new engine was fitted in 1957.

On 26 January 1962, Anna Marta was sold to H.E. Hansen, Marstal, Denmark, and was renamed Minde. Her port of registry was Marstal, and the code letters OZFX were allocated. With the introduction of fixed Lloyd's Register numbers in the late 1960s, Minde was allocated 5235715, which later became her IMO number. In 1971, she was sold to A.K. Nielsen, Broager, Denmark, and was renamed Klaus D. Her port of registry was Egersund, but her code letters remained unchanged. On 22 March 1974, her home port was changed to Broager, although she remained with Egersund as her port of registry. During one of these rebuilds, the ship was derigged and returned to being a motor vessel. Klaus D was a refrigerated cargo vessel.

In 1984, Klaus D was sold to A.M. Tichelaar, Leeuwarden, Netherlands. In August 1985, she was sold to Stichting Werkgelegenheid Projecten, Groningen, Netherlands, and was renamed Enno Doedens Star. Two new diesel engines were fitted to her in 1986. This was followed by a rebuild to a three-masted schooner at Vlissingen, Zeeland, Netherlands, in 1993. She was renamed Rembrandt van Rijn and reflagged to Panama. The call sign 3FVE7 was allocated. From 1994 to 1996, Rembrandt van Rijn operated cruises to Spitsbergen, Norway. In 1998 or 1999 a different IMO number, 8941808, was allocated. She was sold in October 1998 to Balder Nieuwland B.V., Vlissingen, and placed under the management of Oceanwide Nautical Services B.V. Rembrandt van Rijn operated cruises between Panama and the Galapagos Islands from 1998 to 2001. In 2007, she was laid up at Ghent, Belgium.

In December 2011, Rembrandt van Rijn was reflagged to Vanuatu. She was given her current call sign, YJRJ3, and the MMSI number 576988000. Rembrandt van Rijn has a crew of 12 and can accommodate 33 passengers.

== Description ==
Jacoba was 29.21 metres (95 ft 10 in) long with a beam of 6.76 metres (22 ft 2 in) when built. She was assessed at 138 GRT, 78 NRT. Anna Marta was 29.20 metres (95 ft 10 in) long, with a beam of 6.77 metres (22 ft 3 in) and a depth of 2.62 metres (8 ft 7 in). Her two-cylinder single-cycle single-action diesel engine had cylinders of 338 mm (13 5/16 in) bore by 349 mm (13 3/4 in) stroke. The engine was built by Deutsche Kromhout Motorfabriek in Brake, Lower Saxony, Germany and rated at 61 nhp.

Her engine, fitted in 1933, was a three-cylinder four-stroke single-cycle single-action model NE 33 diesel engine, with cylinders of 273 mm (10 3/4 in) bore by 419 mm (16 9/16 in) stroke. It was made by Deutsche Werke A.G., Kiel and was rated at 88 nhp.

Following her lengthening in 1933, Anna Marta was 33.16 metres (108 ft 10 in) long, with a beam of 6.63 metres (21 ft 9 in). Her depth was 2.90 metres (9 ft 6 in), with a draught of 3.35 metres (11 ft 0 in). She was assessed at 174 GRT, 98 NRT. After her 1939 rebuild, she was assessed as 211 GRT, 135 NRT.

Following her 1951 rebuild, Anna Marta was 39.06 metres (128 ft 2 in) long, 6.71 metres (22 ft 0 in) beam, with a depth of 3.48 metres (11 ft 5 in) and a draught of 3.08 metres (10 ft 1 in). The engine fitted that year was built by Deutz AG and was rated at 200 horsepower (150 kW). The engine fitted in 1957 was a 280 horsepower (210 kW) model NE-57 diesel engine by Alpha Diesels A/S. She was assessed at 272 GRT, 121 NRT, 350 DWT.

Following her 1993 rebuild, Enno Doedens Star was 39.22 metres (128 ft 8 in) long, had a beam of 6.65 metres (21 ft 10 in), a depth of 3.59 metres (11 ft 9 in), and a draught of 2.80 metres (9 ft 2 in). She was assessed at 307 GRT, 123 NRT, 350 DWT. Her engines are Cummins VTA-903-M diesel engines with 740 horsepower (550 kW) each. They can propel the ship at 9 knots (17 km/h).

== Trivia ==
American science fiction writer Frederik Pohl dedicated his 1997 book The Siege to Eternity to his shipmates on Rembrandt van Rijn.

== See also ==
- MV Plancius
- MV Ortelius
- SV Noorderlicht
