= MV Hondius hantavirus outbreak =

2026 outbreak on cruise ship

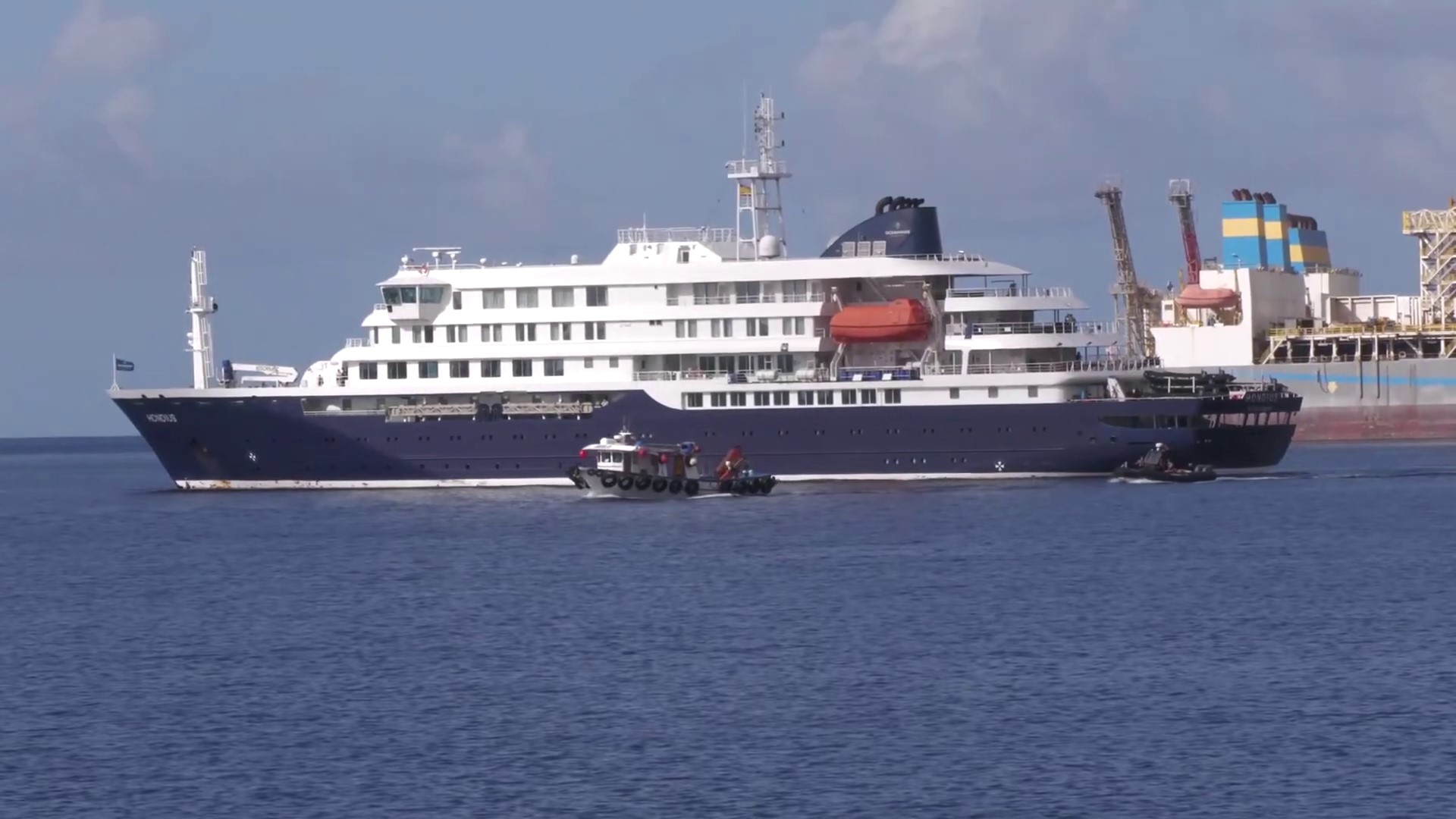
- MV Hondius at the port of Granadilla on 10 May 2026, where the passengers departed the ship for quarantine.
- Disease: Hantavirus pulmonary syndrome
- Pathogen: Andes virus
- Date: 1 April – 2 July 2026 (departure from Ushuaia to last contact completing quarantine and testing negative)
- Confirmed cases: 12 (Note: Cases suspected, confirmed, or deceased are as of 10 June 2026.)
- Suspected cases: 1
- Deaths: 3

In April 2026, an outbreak of hantavirus infection caused by the Andes virus was identified on the Dutch cruise ship MV Hondius. There were ten confirmed cases and two suspected cases directly linked to the outbreak as of 22 May. There have been three deaths, two of which have been confirmed as caused by the Andes virus, the last on 2 May. By 11 May, all passengers had disembarked and been evacuated, many to their home countries for quarantine. On 2 July 2026, the World Health Organization officially declared the outbreak to be over, after the last close contact was released from quarantine.

The Andes virus is the only known hantavirus to spread between humans. It spreads through close, sustained contact between people, and it may be airborne. The World Health Organization has emphasized that the risk of an epidemic is low, as previous outbreaks have only involved transmission in close-contact settings.

The ship departed from Ushuaia, Argentina, on 1 April with plans to visit Antarctica and several islands in the South Atlantic. A passenger died on board on 11 April. His body was taken ashore in Saint Helena on 24 April, where 30 passengers disembarked, including his wife, who died two days later in a Johannesburg hospital. Another passenger died on board on 28 April. A British passenger was sent to Johannesburg on 2 May for treatment in critical but still stable condition. Although the ship was docked at Praia, Cape Verde, for three days, no one disembarked, as local facilities were unable to handle a safe evacuation. After receiving approval from Spanish health authorities, the ship departed for Tenerife, Canary Islands, on 6 May with additional medical resources and 147 individuals on board, arriving on 10 May. Passengers disembarked and evacuation flights repatriated passengers to six European countries and Canada. As of 15 May 2026, former passengers were hospitalized or quarantined in Australia, Canada, France, Germany, the Netherlands, Saint Helena, Singapore, South Africa, Spain, Switzerland, Turkey, and the United States.

On 18 May, MV Hondius arrived in Rotterdam where everyone was retested and then disembarked. The two Dutch medical officers returned home for self-quarantine. The 23 crew from four countries entered quarantine in Rotterdam. The body of a deceased passenger was removed for cremation, and the vessel began disinfection in preparation for returning to service.

== Background ==
=== Hantavirus ===
Locations the Andes virus usually occurs in red, orange, and yellow.

Hantaviruses are a group of over fifty types of viruses that infect rodents and sometimes humans. In rodents, Hantavirus infection, while usually persistent, does not result in symptoms. Hantaviruses may transmit through rodent populations via aerosols or droplets from infected rodent feces, urine, saliva, and blood; through the consumption of contaminated food; or from virus particles shed from skin or fur.

Andes virus is a species of the Hantaviridae taxonomic family of viruses and the only known hantavirus to spread via human-to-human transmission. Past human outbreaks have indicated that transmission of the Andes virus is possible under specific close-contact conditions. The routes and mechanisms of transmission have not been definitively characterized, but airborne transmission is considered a possibility. Transmission typically occurs in cases of close sustained contact, such as household exposure, caregiving without personal protective equipment, and prolonged exposure in poorly ventilated or crowded settings. In humans, Andes virus usually causes hantavirus pulmonary syndrome – a severe illness affecting the heart and lungs with an incubation period of one to seven weeks. Andes virus outbreaks are associated with high case fatality rates of 20 to 40 percent.

On 6 May, it was confirmed that the Andes virus, which is normally found in the Andes Mountains of Argentina and Chile, was responsible for the outbreak on the MV Hondius. The spread of the virus on board has been at least partially attributed to human-to-human transmission. Early reports identified Ushuaia, Argentina, as a possible site of infection. However, no cases of the virus have ever been recorded there or in the region of Tierra del Fuego, and the city lies 1,500 km south of the endemic range of the long-tailed mouse subspecies known to carry the virus.

=== MV Hondius ===
The MV Hondius is owned by the Dutch company Oceanwide Expeditions. The ship has accommodation for 196 passengers across 95 cabins, and a crew of 72. The ship departed from Ushuaia, Argentina, on 1 April with 114 passengers and 61 crew. The first people infected had been travelling farther north in Argentina and into Chile before arrival in Ushuaia. The ship had plans to visit Antarctica and "several isolated islands in the South Atlantic".

After disembarkation at St. Helena, 149 people of 23 nationalities remained on board Hondius. Passengers mostly came from Spain, France, the United Kingdom, and the United States, while the bulk of the crew came from the Philippines. Berth prices on the cruise ranged from €14,000 to €22,000.

== Itinerary and key events ==
Stops made by the MV Hondius during the outbreak and end of voyage in Rotterdam.
- 1 April: MV Hondius departs Ushuaia, Argentina.
- 6 April: The first person begins showing symptoms.
- 11 April: The first person dies on board the ship; it is originally attributed to natural causes.
- 13–15 April: Hondius makes a stop in Tristan da Cunha.
- 24 April: Hondius stops in Saint Helena, where 30 passengers disembark. Among them are the deceased passenger's wife and his remains, both subsequently airlifted to Johannesburg, South Africa.
- 26 April: The wife of the first victim dies in a Johannesburg hospital.
- 2 May: The second on-board fatality and third overall.
- 3 May: The ship arrives at Praia, Cape Verde.
- 4 May: The first positive test for the Andes virus is received.
- 6 May: The ship leaves Cape Verde for Spain. Three more people are evacuated from the ship to the Netherlands, including the ship's doctor.
- 10 May: The ship arrives at the Port of Granadilla in Tenerife. Disembarkation begins; repatriation flights follow.
- 11 May: Two additional people from the ship test positive, bringing the total number of confirmed cases to seven. All passengers and some crew disembark the MV Hondius and are repatriated.
- 12 May: One Spanish passenger from the ship tests positive, the 13 others negative.
- 13–17 May: The ship is at sea with 27 crew, sailing to Rotterdam. On 15 May, one suspected American case proved to be negative, and Canadian health authorities reported the first positive test.
- 18 May: The ship arrives at the Port of Rotterdam, where it docks and the remaining passengers and crew disembark.
- 22 May: One passenger isolating in the Netherlands tests positive for the first time.
- 25 May: One passenger isolating in Spain tests positive for the first time.
- 30 May: After undergoing deep cleaning, MV Hondius is cleared by the Municipal Health Service (the Dutch health authority) to return to service.
- 10 June: One passenger hospitalized on Tristan da Cunha tests positive for the first time.
- 2 July: The World Health Organization declares that the outbreak is over.

== Table of cases ==
Case	First symptom	Positive test	Outcome	Nationality	Treatment location	Refs	Remarks
1	6 April	no test	deceased	Netherlands	MV Hondius		Index case; first fatality on board; assumed, but never proved to be hantavirus
2	24 April	4 May	deceased	Netherlands	Johannesburg, South Africa		Spouse of the index case; symptoms when departing in Saint Helena; died in Johannesburg
3	24 April	2 May	survived	United Kingdom	Johannesburg, South Africa		Hospitalized in ICU; first to test positive for hantavirus
4	28 April	yes	deceased	Germany	MV Hondius		Second fatality on board; third overall; tested positive post-mortem
5	30 April	6 May	survived	Netherlands	Netherlands		The ship's doctor; evacuated by plane from Cape Verde
6	27 April	6 May	survived	United Kingdom	Netherlands		Crew; evacuated by plane from Cape Verde
7	1 May	5 May	survived	Switzerland	Zurich, Switzerland		Experienced symptoms at home after disembarking
8	28 April	10 June	survived	United Kingdom	Tristan da Cunha		Was not able to be formally tested for hantavirus for a long time after showing symptoms due to isolated location, despite being hospitalized
9	12 May	yes	survived	France	Bichat–Claude Bernard Hospital, Paris, France		Developed symptoms during repatriation; placed on life support in ICU; discharged on 6 August
10	11 May	12 May	recovered	Spain	Madrid, Spain		Had slight fever and mild respiratory symptoms, no more symptoms since May 22
-		inconclusive, then negative	-	United States	University of Nebraska Medical Center, Omaha, Nebraska, United States		Flu-like symptoms on board disappeared later; initial tests inconclusive, but 15 May test proved he was never infected; quarantined at UNMC, Omaha
11	14 May	15 May	recovered	Canada	Victoria, British Columbia, Canada		"Presumed" positive 16 May; "confirmed" 18 May by national lab; recovered and discharged as of June 9.
12		22 May	survived	Netherlands	Netherlands		Crew; isolating in the Netherlands
13		25 May	survived	Spain	Gómez Ulla Military Hospital, Madrid, Spain		Tested positive while already in quarantine and was moved to isolation

== Timeline ==
=== April ===
The ship departed from Ushuaia on 1 April with 175 passengers and crew. On 6 April, a 70-year-old Dutch man began showing symptoms, and he died on board on 11 April, initially attributed to generic natural causes. The ship stopped at the British Overseas Territory of Tristan da Cunha on 13–15 April. On 24 April, the Dutchman's body was taken off the ship upon the ship's arrival at the British Overseas Territory of Saint Helena. At this time, 29 passengers disembarked the ship; among them was the man's 69-year-old widow, who later took a plane to South Africa. The disembarked passengers were from 12 countries and returned home before contact tracing began.

On 25 April, the widow, who had unknowingly contracted the virus, boarded KLM flight KL592 from Johannesburg to Amsterdam, but she was removed from the plane before takeoff due to her medical condition, and she died in a hospital in South Africa on 26 April. The widow was on the plane for 45 minutes. After stopping in Saint Helena, the ship continued on to the British Overseas Territory of Ascension Island, where an ill British passenger was removed and flown to South Africa for hospital care. On 27 April, Hondius left Ascension Island.

=== May ===
==== 1–5 May ====
On 2 May, a German woman died on board, and, as of 8 May, her body remains on board the ship. Following the identification of the outbreak on 4 May, passengers were told to limit close contact and frequently use hand sanitizer. On 2 May, the World Health Organization (WHO) first received a report of the hantavirus outbreak.

On 3 May, the ship docked in Praia, the capital of Cape Verde. The authorities said they were sending medical supplies and officials to support the ship, and officials in Praia also expanded safety protocols near the port as a precautionary measure. The Cape Verdean government announced the creation of an isolation area and the coordination of a multidisciplinary team to assist the ship's passengers and crew. Around the same time, South African officials began precautionary contact tracing. By 4 May, gene sequencing had identified the Andes virus in at least one infected person.

==== 6 May ====
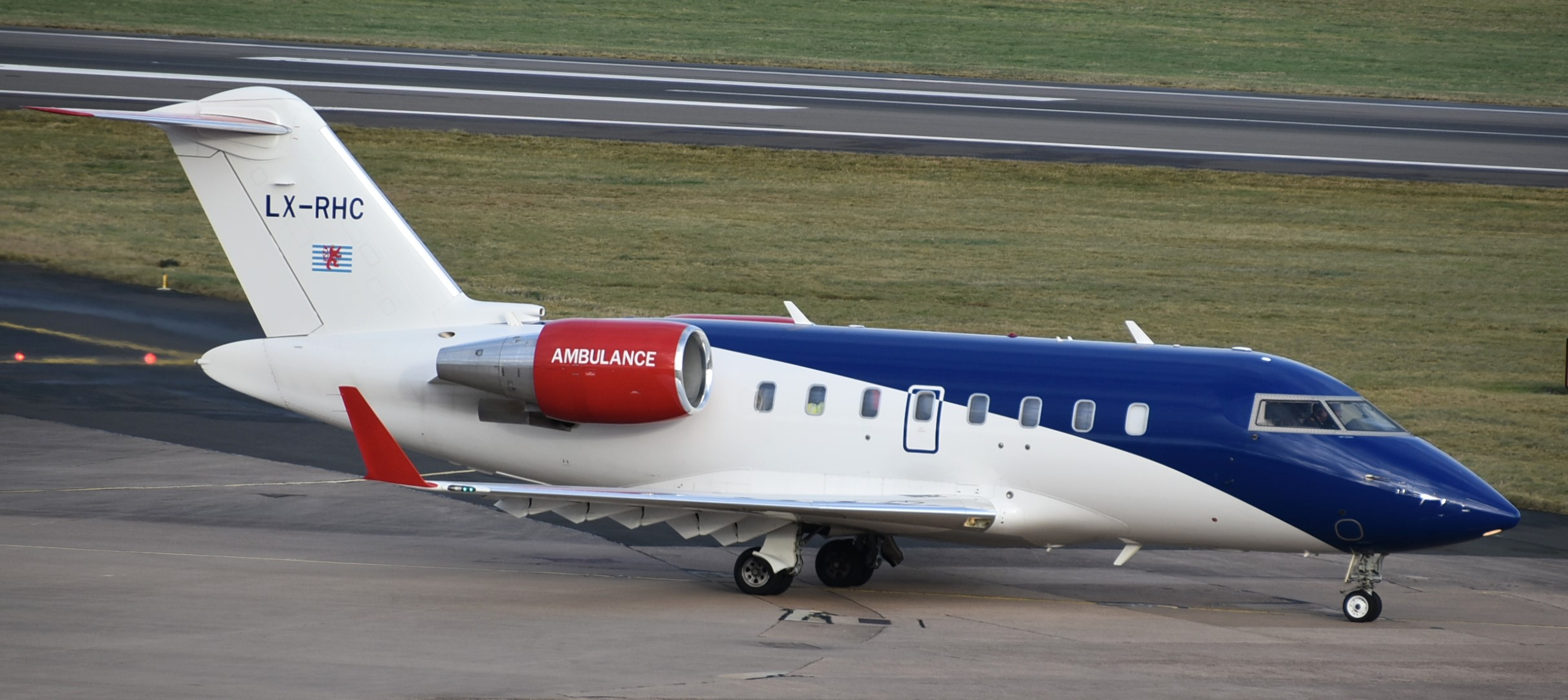
The first evacuation flight was carried out by an air ambulance (LX-RHC) of Luxembourg Air Rescue.

On 6 May, the ship was anchored outside Cape Verde, a country not deemed capable of dealing with the medical emergency on board. Despite the objections of the Canary Islands' regional president, Spain approved the plan for the Hondius to dock in Tenerife, citing its moral and legal obligation to the passengers.

The Swiss government confirmed that a man infected with hantavirus was being treated in Zurich, Switzerland. Swiss authorities confirmed that the patient was a passenger on the cruise ship, bringing the total number of infections to eight. The man was one of the 30 passengers who disembarked on 24 April. On the same day, it was announced that three more people experiencing symptoms had been sent to the Netherlands by two air ambulances for treatment; these were a 56-year-old Briton, a 41-year-old Dutch national, and a 65-year-old German, one of which was the ship's doctor.

The first plane carrying two patients landed in the Netherlands on 6 May; the German national was later transferred to University Hospital of Düsseldorf and the Briton to Leiden University Medical Center. The second plane carrying the Dutch national diverted to Gran Canaria and awaited a replacement aircraft after experiencing technical issues in its life support systems. On 6 May, the ship left Cape Verde for Spain. Four medical experts embarked while the ship was leaving Cape Verde. Two of these were medical specialists from Amsterdam University Medical Center and Central Military Hospital, a military hospital in Utrecht. The two others were epidemiologists from Italy and the Netherlands, meant to investigate the scope of the virus on the ship. The selection, transport, and coordination of these experts was assisted by the WHO and European Centre for Disease Prevention and Control.

Two anonymous Argentine investigators claimed that the leading hypothesis was that the index case—the Dutch citizen who showed the first symptoms—had contracted the virus. On 6 May, the Argentine health ministry published a report detailing the movements of the index case, the Dutch citizen who presented the first symptoms, prior to the ship's departure; the report showed he had gone on a four-month road trip between 27 November 2025 and 1 April 2026, spanning Chile, Uruguay, and Argentina. Meanwhile, the National Ministry of Health and the Malbrán Institute are advancing the epidemiological investigation at the local level, capturing and testing rodents along the route the Dutch passenger travelled, as well as conducting contact tracing. The index case had returned to Argentina from Uruguay only four days before departure.

==== 7 May ====
On 7 May, one of the flight attendants on the flight from Johannesburg to Amsterdam on 26 April was admitted to Amsterdam University Medical Center on suspicion of infection, having been in contact with the deceased Dutch woman. On 7 May, the diverted flight carrying the third patient from the ship landed in the Netherlands, and that patient was hospitalized at Radboud University Medical Center. Later that day, the patient tested positive for the virus. The same day, the Singapore Communicable Diseases Agency announced that two of its residents who had been on the cruise and on the same flight as the Dutch woman from Saint Helena to Johannesburg—one of them symptomatic—were being tested. They tested negative on 8 May.

A comprehensive risk analysis of the individuals on the two flights the deceased woman had taken was completed by GGD Kennemerland, the Dutch municipal health service responsible for Amsterdam Airport Schiphol. Five individuals were categorized as high risk for having assisted the woman in leaving KLM flight KL592; the hospitalized flight attendant is one of them. An additional 50 individuals were deemed lower risk, as they had been seated within two rows of the woman. The GGD is still attempting to contact these individuals. The remaining individuals have been informed and are considered to be at the lowest risk. From the first flight from Saint Helena to Johannesburg, three individuals have been tested due to symptoms; two of those tests have since come back negative.

It was reported that two patients had been identified as having the Andes virus in lab work by the National Institute for Communicable Diseases of South Africa. The same day, the UK Health Security Agency (UKHSA) told the BBC that all thirty people who left the ship during its stop in Saint Helena had been identified and contact traced. Two of these were Britons who are currently isolating without symptoms. The Quebec Health Minister confirmed that three Canadians are isolating in Quebec and Ontario. Two of them disembarked in Saint Helena on 24 April, and the third flew on the same flight as the deceased woman to Johannesburg. On 7 May, Oceanwide Expeditions said the ship was expected to arrive at the Port of Granadilla, Tenerife, in the early hours of 10 May.

==== 8 May ====
On 8 May, it was confirmed that the second British national in a health facility in South Africa, who had been on the same flight as the deceased Dutch woman, tested positive. Another Briton was suspected by the UKHSA of having contracted the virus on the island of Tristan da Cunha, where the ship was docked between 13 and 15 April. This individual was currently hospitalized on the island, and their spouse was isolating. The KLM stewardess tested negative for the virus on 8 May. On this day, GGD Kennemerland announced that everyone on flight KL592 was being monitored and in contact with the GGD, an escalation of the prior risk analysis which only deemed the two rows around the deceased to be at risk. Secretary of State for Health Javier Padilla Bernáldez also confirmed that a Spanish passenger on KL592 was symptomatic and hospitalized in Alicante. The individual sat two rows behind the deceased, and was thus classified as lower risk. The US Centers for Disease Control and Prevention (CDC) classified the outbreak as 'Level 3' emergency response, the lowest on the CDC classification scale. The US administration announced the publication of a full report on the outbreak later that day. In a press conference, the Director of Epidemiology and Environmental Health for Tierra del Fuego's Ministry of Health stated that the patients on the Hondius were unlikely to have been infected in the province.

Evacuation plans for the arrival of the ship on the Canary Islands were being finalized. Spain was coordinating the arrival of the ship with 22 countries, and the WHO. Almost all countries were sending evacuation aircraft for their citizens, and the EU provided two aircraft for those who did not have an assigned flight. Countries had differing quarantine plans for their nationals once evacuated.

There had been three deaths, with two confirmed to have been caused by hantavirus. The other one remained under investigation. As of 8 May, the WHO reported two probable cases and six confirmed cases, for a total of eight. The UKHSA reported one additional suspected case, with two Britons being confirmed infected.

The sequences of the virus isolated from a Swiss resident was published on virological.org on 8 May. The isolate was designated "ANDV/Switzerland/Hu-3337/2026". Nextstrain pages were set up for this outbreak using these sequences on the same day.

==== 9–10 May ====
On 9 May, the ship was en route to the Canary Islands and expected to arrive early on 10 May.

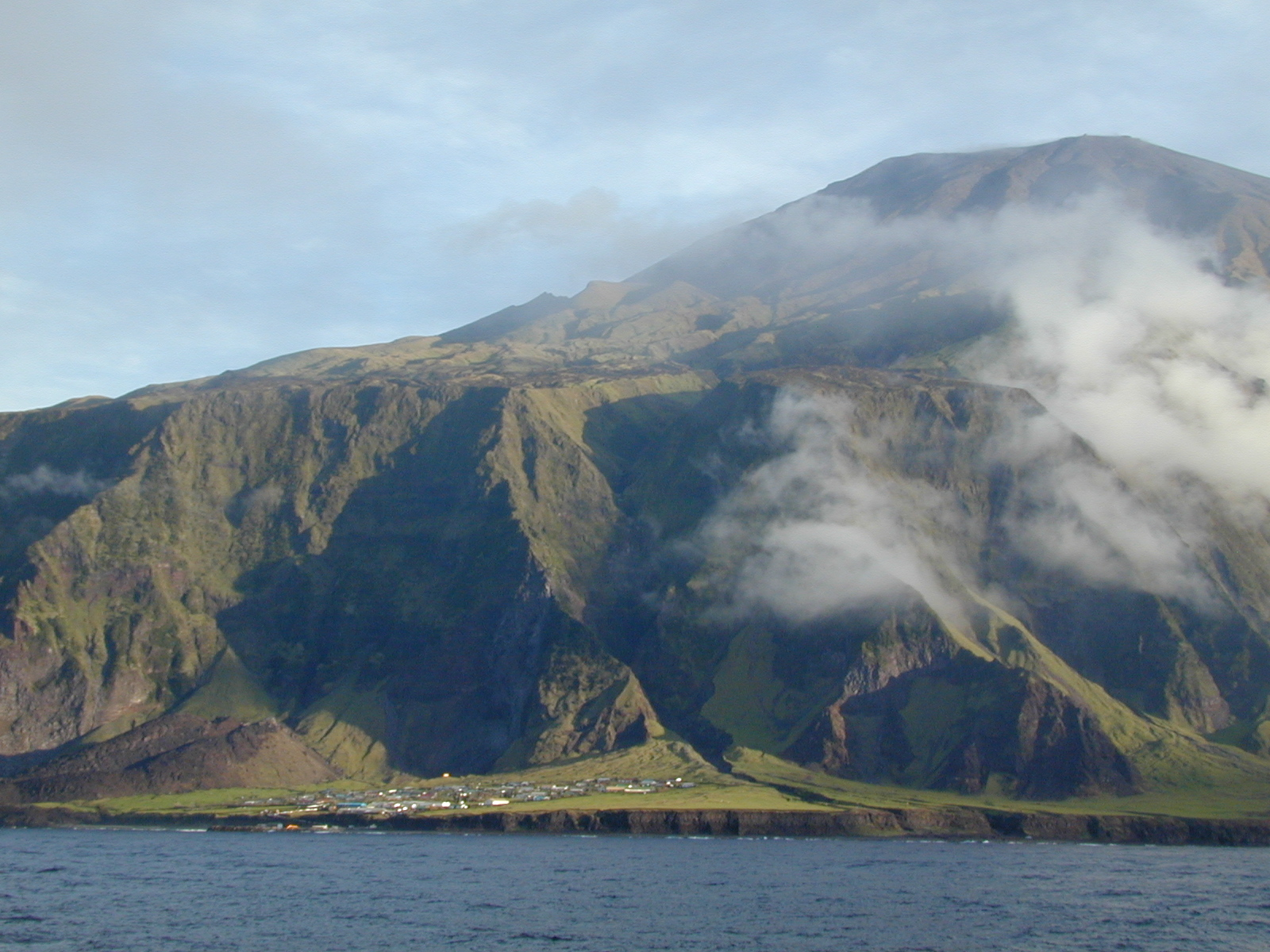
Edinburgh of the Seven Seas, the only settlement on Tristan da Cunha. One inhabitant is suspected of having the virus.

On 10 May, British military personnel from the 16 Air Assault Brigade parachuted down to Tristan da Cunha from a RAF A400M Atlas, where one of its 220 residents, an earlier passenger on the ship, was suspected of having contracted the virus. As the island has no airstrip, parachuting was the only option given the time-sensitive nature of the situation – the nearest port (in South Africa) is over a week sailing time away. In total six paratroopers, a Royal Air Force (RAF) consultant and an army nurse arrived to the island while oxygen supplies and medical aid were also dropped. This comes after the island reported their oxygen reserves being at a critical level, ruling out sending equipment by ship from Ascension Island.

The ship arrived in the Port of Granadilla, around 05:30 WET on 10 May and began disembarkation. Spanish health minister Mónica García described the planning to prevent hantavirus spread as "unprecedented". At Spain's request, an EU air ambulance stationed in Norway and crewed by Norwegian doctors was sent to Tenerife to be on stand-by in case of any serious illness found during disembarkation. The passengers disembarked in order of their homeward-bound flight departure time, with the Spanish nationals disembarking first. The first evacuation flight took off at 13:31 WET. When the French evacuees arrived at a French hospital, Prime Minister Sébastien Lecornu announced that one of the five French nationals showed symptoms fitting the virus during the flight. As of late 10 May WET, seven evacuation flights had taken off, transporting 94 passengers to six European countries and Canada.

Some of the ship's crew stayed on board to take it to Rotterdam in the Netherlands after its planned departure from Tenerife on 11 May for the disinfection of the entire ship. The body of a passenger that died on board will also remain on the ship until its arrival in Rotterdam. The rest of the crew were to be evacuated by a Dutch government plane on 11 May.

A flight transporting evacuated passengers landed in Manchester around 21:00 on 10 May. The passengers—consisting of twenty UK citizens, one German national residing in the UK, and one Japanese man (who was evacuated at Japan's request)—were hospitalized at Arrowe Park Hospital, the location of UK's initial quarantine during the COVID-19 pandemic.

==== 11 May ====
It was announced that the symptomatic French national had tested positive, with her health worsening overnight. Additionally, one asymptomatic American tested positive, and another had mild symptoms. The French government increased its public health alertness level, and had identified 22 French nationals who were high risk contact cases with infected individuals. Later, the WHO reported that the woman was in "very critical condition", and that she had already shown symptoms while on the ship. In the evening of 11 May local time, one of the Spanish nationals who had arrived in Spain the day before tested positive. The 13 other Spanish nationals tested negative.

During the evacuation of the final passengers aboard the MV Hondius, a Spanish officer died of a heart attack at the port. Around 20:00 WET, the ship left Tenerife for Rotterdam with 25 crew members and two medics from the RIVM after all passengers and 35 crew members successfully disembarked and were repatriated. The body of the deceased German national was still on board. The journey is expected to take six days, with the ship arriving in the evening of 17 May. In total, 122 individuals disembarked the ship in Tenerife and were repatriated to their home countries, or the Netherlands for those nationalities that did not provide their own evacuation flights.

==== 12 May ====
A Spanish passenger was confirmed positive, exhibiting symptoms, and was isolated in hospital.

Twelve hospital workers at the Radboud University Medical Center in Nijmegen, Netherlands, failed to comply with protocols and were placed in isolation. The hospital staff followed standard protocols rather than strict protocols while drawing the patient's blood during admission on 7 May, and did not follow appropriate safety protocols when draining the patient's urine on 9 May.

==== 13 May ====
Since the hospitalization of the French passenger on 10 May, her condition has worsened. On 13 May, French authorities stated that she is on life-support. They also said that this is "the final stage of supportive care". That same day, the WHO posted its third official update regarding the outbreak, and adjusted one of the previously confirmed cases to inconclusive after a second test came back negative, awaiting a third test from the American national who had shown no symptoms.

==== 15 May ====
On 15 May, the CDC announced that an American passenger who had developed flu-like symptoms on board and who had initially been listed as having "inconclusive" test results was retested with negative result and showed no antibodies, meaning he was never infected.

A Canadian passenger isolating in British Columbia tested "presumptively positive", with the patient hospitalized and three others under medical observation. While awaiting national laboratory confirmation, health officials are treating the case as positive during the 21-day isolation period.

==== 18 May ====
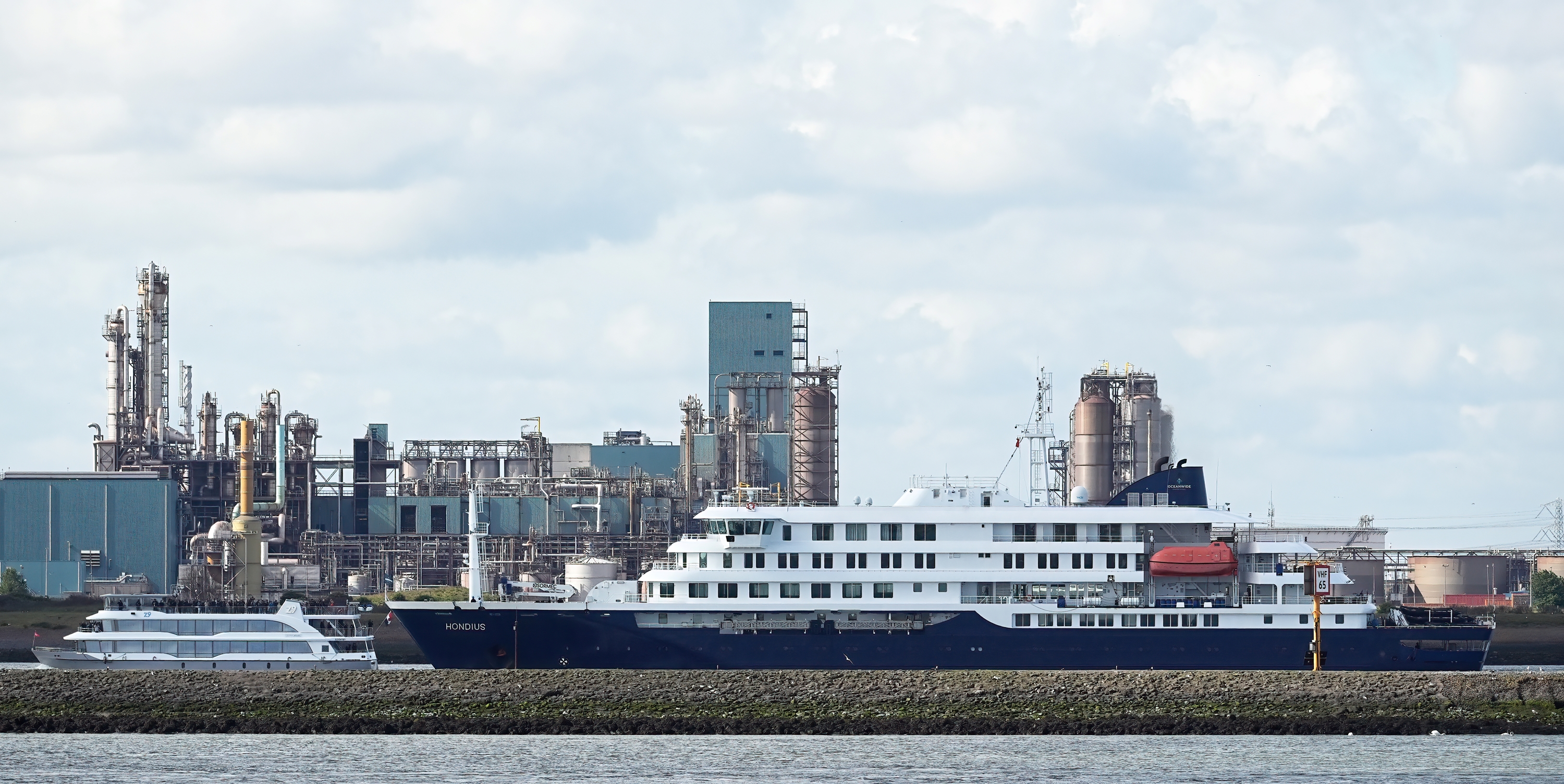
The Hondius arriving in Rotterdam. On the left is a tour boat from where the press could follow the arrival.

On 18 May, MV Hondius docked in Rotterdam. Disinfection of the vessel began, and is estimated to take 3 to 4 days. Five crew members, including the captain, will stay on board during the disinfection. The remaining on-board were tested again and disembarked. Of those, the two Dutch medical workers went home, where they would self-quarantine. The 20 non-Dutch crew (17 from the Philippines and 3 from Ukraine) entered into quarantine for six weeks in separate cabins. The body of the deceased German woman was taken off board to be cremated in the Netherlands. The status of the Canadian passenger was updated by the national lab and "confirmed" positive.

==== 22 May ====
A crew member already in isolation in the Netherlands tested positive, raising the total number of cases to twelve, including the three deaths. No deaths have been reported since 2 May.

The Royal Navy ship HMS Medway arrives at Tristan da Cunha, bringing additional medical supplies and a civilian medical team to replace the military medical team who had parachuted onto the island on 10 May.

==== 24 May ====
A Spanish national who was evacuated from the ship tests positive while quarantining in the Gómez Ulla Military Hospital. After testing positive, the patient was transferred to an isolation unit.

HMS Medway departs Tristan da Cunha, extracting the military medics and paratoopers who had parachuted onto the island on 10 May.

==== 28 May ====
The patient with hantavirus who was hospitalized at Leiden University Medical Center in the Netherlands is discharged.

==== 30 May ====
After undergoing deep cleaning, MV Hondius is cleared by the Municipal Health Service (the Dutch health authority) to return to service. The ship is scheduled to depart Rotterdam on 6 June en route to Svalbard for resumption of service on 13 June.

=== June ===
==== 3 June ====
It is reported that one of the Radboud University Medical Center employees, who was placed in isolation after not observing proper safety protocols during the treatment of a hantavirus patient, tested weakly positive for hantavirus. The employee was not symptomatic, and subsequent tests were negative. The National Institute for Public Health and the Environment and Radboud University Medical Center do not consider the employee to be a positive case, as the subsequent negative tests and lack of symptoms are not consistent with a hantavirus infection.

==== 5 June ====
The private yacht Titaina Explorer departs from Pitcairn Island (a remote British Overseas Territory) for Easter Island, evacuating an asymptomatic American woman who had travelled on the MV Hondius. The woman had travelled from the United States to Tahiti on 7 May, then travelled to Pitcairn Island, where she had been isolating. Pitcairn Island is a remote island with no airport and infrequent maritime services, so the United States spent $750,000 to charter the private yacht to transport the woman to Easter Island — Easter Island has flights to Santiago, from where the woman could then be transported to the United States for treatment if necessary. Due to the woman not disclosing her exposure to the virus when she travelled through Tahiti on the way to Pitcairn Island, French Polynesian authorities refused to allow the woman to transit through Tahiti, causing delays in finding a way to evacuate the woman to the United States.

==== 9 June ====
It is reported that the patient who was hospitalized in British Columbia, Canada was discharged towards the end of the previous week.

==== 10 June ====
The patient hospitalized on Tristan da Cunha tests positive for the virus.

=== July ===
==== 2 July ====
The last identified close contact of a person exposed to the virus completes quarantine. As a result, the World Health Organization declares the outbreak to be over.

==== 3 July ====
The civilian medical team sent to Tristan da Cunha from the Falkland Islands to assist in treating a patient with a hantavirus infection departs on the MFV Edinburgh.

=== August ===
==== 6 August ====
The French woman who had been hospitalized in a Paris intensive care unit with a hantavirus infection is discharged after 3 months in hospital.

== On board health care and monitoring ==
The Hondius is equipped with a cabin for the ship's doctor, normally only one, and an infirmary. It is intended more for the minor health problems typically arising at sea, and stocks anti-inflammatory drugs, some over-the-counter medications, and oxygen tanks. It lacks the kind of sophisticated equipment such as scanners or ventilators needed to diagnose or treat serious respiratory illness.

By the end of April, the ship's doctor was among the two crew members who were very ill and confined to quarters. On 1 May, one of the passengers, who is a doctor, began rendering medical assistance to other passengers and crew. As the situation escalated, he also provided health care information resources for passengers on board, as well as became the central point of contact on board for health authorities. While docked outside Cape Verde, two doctors and one nurse made three trips to the ship to provide additional care to passengers.

On 6 May, four medical experts embarked while the ship was leaving Cape Verde. Two of these were medical specialists from Amsterdam University Medical Center and Central Military Hospital in Utrecht. The two others were epidemiologists from Italy and the Netherlands, meant to investigate the scope of the virus on the ship. The selection, transport and coordination of these experts was assisted by the WHO and European Centre for Disease Prevention and Control.

== International response ==
The World Health Organization (WHO) issued guidance aimed at port facilities and health authorities and agencies handling the disembarkation and monitoring of individuals on the MV Hondius.

=== Passenger monitoring and contact tracing ===
The WHO has been coordinating monitoring of those who disembarked or were evacuated with health care agencies in twelve countries, including Canada, Denmark, Germany, the Netherlands, New Zealand, Saint Kitts and Nevis, Singapore, Sweden, Switzerland, Turkey, the United Kingdom, and the United States.

==== By country ====
Passengers repatriated to their home country or being treated in other locations as of 8 May include nationals of Argentina, Belgium, Canada, Denmark, Germany, Greece, Guatemala, India, Montenegro, the Netherlands, the Philippines, Portugal, Singapore, South Africa, Spain, Switzerland, Ukraine, the United Kingdom, and the United States.

Australia – Australia sent a plane to evacuate the Australians, New Zealanders and nationals from some Asian countries. Six people — 4 Australian citizens, one Permanent Resident of Australia and one New Zealand citizen — were quarantined at the Bullsbrook Centre for National Resilience (which was originally planned for use during the COVID-19 pandemic) until 23 June.

Canada – As of 12 May, there are 16 individuals in Canada being monitored for potential exposure. Four Canadian nationals who were on board the MV Hondius were flown to CFB Bagotville, Quebec, on 10 May and were transferred to Victoria, British Columbia, where they are to self-isolate for at least 21 days. One passenger initially tested "presumed" positive on 15 May, after displaying "very minor symptoms", later updated to "confirmed" by the national lab. On 12 May, the Government of Canada announced that any passengers who had been aboard the MV Hondius after 1 April would be prevented from boarding a flight to Canada.

France – Five French nationals were on board the MV Hondius and were evacuated to Paris on 10 May. One French evacuee developed symptoms of the virus while in flight and later tested positive for hantavirus. She was hospitalized in intensive care in a Paris hospital until 6 August. The virus infecting her was sequenced, and the French Minister of Health stated that there was no evidence that a new or more dangerous or transmissible variant had emerged. The remaining four passengers quarantined at Bichat–Claude Bernard Hospital in Paris until 21 June. Around twenty contacts in France were is isolation as of 16 May, but none have shown any symptoms.

Germany – One German passenger died aboard the ship. Another German national was evacuated on 6 May and is currently hospitalized in Germany, but has since tested negative.

Netherlands – Eight passengers and five crew hold Dutch nationality; two Dutch passengers died, one aboard the ship and one in South Africa. On 6 May, two passengers who later tested positive for the virus were admitted to Radboud University Medical Center and Leiden University Medical Center, respectively. On 12 May, twelve employees at the Radboud University Medical Center were placed in isolation after not following proper safety protocols. One of these staff members later tested weakly positive for hantavirus while in isolation, but subsequent tests were negative and the individual remained asymptomatic, causing Dutch authorities to consider this test a false positive. On 11 June, Radbound employees who were only exposed to a hantavirus patient's urine were released from quarantine, as this was considered a low-risk exposure. On 18 June, almost all MV Hondius passengers and crew who had been isolating in the Netherlands were released from quarantine; one person remains in quarantine, as they were a close contact of someone who later tested positive for hantavirus. On 22 June, all remaining Radboud employees were released from quarantine.

Philippines – There were 38 Filipino citizens on board the MV Hondius, consisting of 24 hotel staff and 14 deck and engine staff. The crew was evacuated to the Netherlands in three batches, where they were to undergo a 42-day quarantine upon arrival. The first four crew members were evacuated on 10 May. All Filipino passengers were able to reach the Netherlands, where they all tested negative for hantavirus. They arrived in Manila on 19 June, after finishing their quarantine.

Singapore – Two Singapore residents were passengers on the ship and were also on the same flight as a confirmed hantavirus case from Saint Helena to Johannesburg on 25 April. Upon returning to Singapore, both were isolated at the National Centre for Infectious Diseases for 30 days until they were released on 6 June after continuously testing negative.

Spain – Spanish citizens onboard are to be transferred to the Gómez Ulla Military Hospital in Madrid for isolation. The decision by Spanish authorities to transfer patients to the Spanish capital was opposed by president of the Community of Madrid Isabel Díaz Ayuso.

South Africa – One of the passengers died in a Johannesburg hospital on 26 April, and a seriously British passenger was admitted to a Johannesburg hospital a few days later, although neither's illness was initially identified. On 1 May, South Africa's National Institute for Communicable Diseases began investigating the illness experienced by these two passengers as a possible infectious disease; the British passenger tested positive for hantavirus on 2 May. The Institute subsequently tested the deceased passenger, who also tested positive for the virus. The Institute began contact tracing on 2 May, before the virus had been positively identified as hantavirus.

Switzerland – A Swiss national who disembarked in Saint Helena tested positive and was admitted to a hospital in Zurich.

Turkey – Three Turkish nationals, including the YouTuber Ruhi Çenet, were on the ship and were repatriated on 10 May on a separate government chartered flight. Çenet, who disembarked at Saint Helena on 24 April, drew controversy after attending public events in Turkey following the outbreak announcement, as shown in photographs. The national ministry of health had not imposed quarantines at the time. However, Çenet claims the picture was taken before the WHO announced the outbreak. Since then, quarantines have been imposed according to WHO guidelines, including for the repatriated nationals from the ship.

United Kingdom – One British national left the cruise ship in Tristan da Cunha and seven nationals in Saint Helena. There are two other confirmed cases: one evacuated to the Netherlands, and the other to South Africa. On 10 May, medical clinicians and specialist equipment were delivered to Tristan da Cunha by paratroopers from the 16 Air Assault Brigade. On 10 May, in Tenerife, 22 individuals – 19 passengers and three crew – were taken off the ship and screened for hantavirus. They were placed on chartered flights which landed in Manchester "about 9pm on Sunday". They entered a 72-hour quarantine in self-contained flats at Arrowe Park Hospital in Wirral, then were asked to voluntarily self-isolate for 42 days at home, ending on 22 June. Among these 22, there is one German national residing in the UK and one Japanese individual evacuated at the request of Japan.

United States – On 11 May, eighteen American passengers were repatriated on a US government medical flight. Fifteen of the passengers were transported to the National Quarantine Unit at the University of Nebraska Medical Center for monitoring and evaluation; one additional passenger who initially tested positive for hantavirus was isolated in the Nebraska Biocontainment Unit at the University of Nebraska Medical Center instead (although this test was later discovered to be a false positive test). The remaining two passengers initially quarantined at Emory University in Atlanta, Georgia due to one of them developing symptoms on the medical flight, but the pair were later relocated to the National Quarantine Center in Nebraska. At the end of May, 12 of the passengers were released from the National Quarantine Center to complete the remainder of their quarantine at home. The quarantine was lifted for all 18 passengers at 2 pm CST on 21 June. Passengers who disembarked the MV Hondius earlier (before the outbreak was identified) and returned to the United States underwent home quarantine until 6 June. As of 15 May, 41 people in 16 states were being monitored. One U.S. citizen who disembarked at Saint Helena traveled to Pitcairn Island (a remote British Overseas Territory), where she subsequently went into isolation; on 5 June, the passenger was evacuated from the island by a private yacht chartered by the U.S. government, heading to Easter Island, from where they could fly to Chile and then the United States.

=== Canary Islands arrival ===
On 6 May, the ship was anchored near Cape Verde, which was not considered able to handle the scale of operation needed for the ship's safe evacuation. Instead, it intended to travel to Tenerife and have its passengers disembark there. However president of the Canary Islands Fernando Clavijo said he "cannot allow [Hondius] to enter the Canaries" and refused to receive the ship in Tenerife. Clavijo's refusal stemmed from his concern that the ship's arrival would endanger the people of the Canary Islands, a view shared by many islanders, particularly in light of their experiences during the COVID-19 pandemic. The cruise company said that "Spain has a moral and legal obligation to assist these people, among whom are several Spanish citizens".

Despite the objections of the Canary Islands' president, Spain approved the plan for the Hondius to dock in Tenerife, with its health agency stating it was "in accordance with international law and humanitarian principles". The ship set sail for the islands on 6 May.

=== Rodent investigation ===
The index case couple had been traveling through Argentina prior to boarding the MV Hondius, leading experts to believe the couple may have contracted the virus in the country. Argentinian officials initially believed that the couple may have contracted the virus in Ushaia in the Tierra del Fuego Province — the same city that the MV Hondius departed from — while visiting a landfill for birdwatching. Hantavirus had never been detected in the Tierra del Fuego archipelago before.

From 18 to 22 May, Argentine scientists from the Malbrán Institute trapped and tested rodents for hantavirus in the forests around Ushuaia. From 8 to 12 June, a team of scientists from the Malbrán Institute, working with scientists from the United States' Centers for Disease Control, trapped and tested rodents in Malargüe in the Mendoza Province for hantavirus, a city that had been visited by the deceased couple. No Oligoryzomys longicaudatus specimens — the species considered the primary reservoir of the Andes virus — were captured in either location.

Hantavirus was detected in 5 of the 144 rodents captured near Ushuaia, and was determined to be a previously undescribed viral variant related to the Andes virus; however, it was a different variant of the virus to the one that spread on the MV Hondius. Prior to this investigation, hantavirus had never been detected in the Tierra del Fuego archipelago.

== Misinformation and disinformation ==
Several conspiracy theories emerged online following the outbreak. Some made the false claim that the outbreak was caused by Israel, and that the name of the virus is derived from the Hebrew word for scam or fake (hantavirus takes its name from the Hantan River in Korea). Other false claims portray the hantavirus outbreak as a side-effect of the COVID-19 vaccine and as a scheme by pharmaceutical companies to sell vaccines, citing Moderna's development of a hantavirus vaccine in 2024. Several AI-generated images with false information about the outbreak have circulated on social media. Unsupported claims that Ivermectin can cure hantavirus were endorsed by far-right former US Congress member Marjorie Taylor Greene.

The World Health Organization addressed the misinformation regarding the outbreak in Q&A sessions on social media.

== Legacy and impact ==
=== Impetus for further study ===
There is little evidence about how hantavirus is transmitted because outbreaks are rare and mostly limited to Latin America. The Andes strain is the only one which can spread person-to-person, and little is known about it; no vaccine is available.

The UK Health Security Agency (UKHSA) is planning a study to learn more about Andes virus based on the cruise ship outbreak. Twenty British nationals who were on board and potentially exposed to the virus have volunteered to participate. None of the Britons isolating in the UK tested positive.

The UKHSA study is being run by the International Severe Acute Respiratory and Emergency Infection Consortium (ISARIC), known for gathering evidence about infectious diseases. It seeks evidence about how and when individuals become infectious and for how long; who gets sick, the progression of the disease, and what the risk factors are. A key question is whether individuals can become infected without having symptoms, as this would impact how health agencies monitor the disease and implement contact-tracing.

== See also ==
- 1993 Four Corners hantavirus outbreak
- 2012 Yosemite hantavirus outbreak
- COVID-19 pandemic on cruise ships
  - COVID-19 pandemic on Diamond Princess
- Infectious disease on cruise ships
