= Talab =

Talab may refer to:

- Bakshi Ka Talab, residential area in Uttar Pradesh, India
- Gol Talab, small oval-shaped water tank/pond in Islampur, Old Dhaka, Dhaka, Bangladesh
- Talab al-Qawasmi, Palestinian politician
- Talab Tillo, suburban area of Jammu City in the Indian union territory of Jammu and Kashmir
- Talab, alternate name of Tarlab, a village in Iran

== See also ==
- Ta'lab, the moon god
