= National Quarantine Unit =

Federally funded quarantine facility in Omaha, Nebraska

Coordinates: 41.2538°N 95.9751°W

- Abbreviation: NQU
- Formation: 2019
- Type: Quarantine and isolation facility
- Headquarters: Dr. Edwin G. & Dorothy Balbach Davis Global Center
- Location: Omaha, Nebraska, United States
- Parent organization: University of Nebraska Medical Center Global Center for Health Security

The National Quarantine Unit (NQU) is a federally funded quarantine and isolation facility in the United States located at the University of Nebraska Medical Center (UNMC) in Omaha, Nebraska. The unit is designed to house and monitor people who may have been exposed to highly hazardous communicable diseases or other high-consequence pathogens.

== History ==
=== Nebraska Biocontainment Unit ===
Following the September 11 attacks, there was a national push to prepare for bioterrorism attacks, with the U.S. government providing funding to several hospitals to prepare for these kinds of threats, including the University of Nebraska Medical Center. In 2004, the Nebraska Department of Health and Human Services commissioned the Nebraska Medical Center to build a biocontainment for patients with highly contagious infectious diseases.

On March 7, 2005, the Nebraska Biocontainment Unit (NBU) was opened at the Nebraska Medical Center. The center was funded by both the federal government and the University of Nebraska Medical Center. At the time of its opening, there were only two other such facilities: A two-bed isolation unit at the United States Army Medical Research Institute of Infectious Diseases and another two-bed unit at Emory University Hospital. For the first nine years of the facility's operation, it did not treat any patients, instead conducting drills in preparation for a patient that required the facility.

In September 2014, the Nebraska Biocontainment Unit treated its first patient, when it admitted a patient with Ebola virus disease during the Western African Ebola epidemic. This facility was one of only four such biocontainment facilities in the United States suitable for treating Ebola, with a total of only 19 beds nationwide. The University of Nebraska Medical Center's isolation unit had 10 of these beds, the most of any of the hospitals — although the center's director claimed publicly that the hospital could only realistically handle up to two Ebola patients at a time due to the required staffing and hazardous waste management. The facility ultimately treated three of the Ebola patients who were treated in the United States. The UNMC has cited its Ebola response as a major part of the institutional experience that later supported its national quarantine and special-pathogen preparedness programs.

=== Global Center for Health Security ===
In 2016, the UNMC received at $19.8 million grant from the United States Department of Health and Human Services (HHS) to developing a training and simulation center for managing infectious diseases, as well as a monitoring facility for patients exposed to infectious diseases. In June 2017, the UNMC created the Global Center for Health Security to manage these facilities.

In November 2019, the unit enrolled its first students. Within two months, due to the emergence of COVID-19, the facility was activated and temporarily suspended in-person training activities at the TSQC.

== Facilities and operations ==
The NBU is intended for treating patients with infectious diseases; the NQU is instead intended for isolating and monitoring patients who may have been exposed to infectious diseases but do not currently require serious treatment. In 2026, the unit's medical director Angela Hewlett commented that the NQU is "more like a hotel than a patient care space."

== Activations and public health responses ==
=== COVID-19 pandemic ===
Patients requiring hospital care were treated in the NBU, while patients who were only mildly ill were treated in the NQU.

=== 2026 Andes virus cruise ship outbreak ===
On May 11, 2026, the UNMC's National Quarantine Unit and Nebraska Biocontainment Unit admitted U.S. citizens evacuated from the cruise ship MV Hondius after it experienced an outbreak of Andes virus, a type of hantavirus. Of the 18 U.S. passengers evacuated from the ship, 15 were quarantined at the NQU; one passenger who had tested positive for the virus was instead admitted to the Nebraska Biocontainment Unit (NBU), while the two remaining passengers were quarantined at the Emory University Hospital. On May 13, after testing negative for the virus, the patient who had been admitted to the NBU was relocated to the NQU.

Initially, all of the passengers voluntarily agreed to quarantine at these facilities. The Centers for Disease Control requested that these passengers remain at the isolation facilities until May 31. On May 18, the CDC announced that it had issued quarantine orders to two passengers, prohibiting them from leaving the facilities until May 31.

== See also ==
- Ebola virus cases in the United States
- COVID-19 pandemic in the United States
