= Ruhi Çenet =

Turkish YouTuber (born 1990)

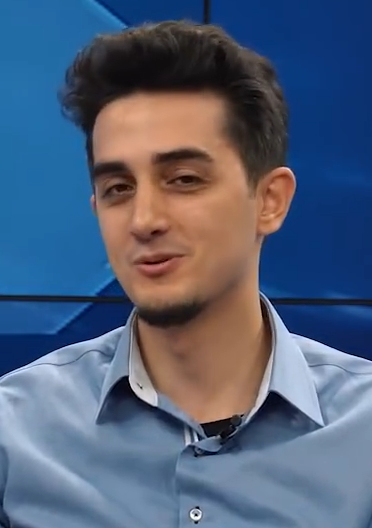
- Çenet in 2019
- Born: 20 October 1990 (age 36); Aydın, Turkey

YouTube information
- Channel: Ruhi Çenet Documentaries
- Years active: 2012–present
- Genres: Travel; education
- Subscribers: 19.6 million
- Views: 3.228 billion
- Last updated: 4 October 2026

Ruhi Çenet (born 20 October 1990) is a Turkish YouTuber and travel blogger. He is known for traveling to and reporting on hard-to-reach and obscure places. According to Social Blade, he is the 9th most subscribed YouTuber in Turkey. Çenet began making videos in 2012.

== Early life ==
Ruhi Çenet was born on 20 October 1990 in Aydın, Turkey. His father was an assistant professor at Bandırma Onyedi Eylül University, but he was discharged in 2016 for suspicions of his involvement in the Gülen movement. His sister, Sümeyra, is also a YouTuber and frequently travels with him. Çenet went to India in 2017 to continue his education and traveled all over the country, making vlogs of his experience. Çenet then moved back to Turkey, to Istanbul.

== Career ==
Çenet created his YouTube channel in November 2012. At the time, YouTube in Turkey was still in its early stages and it was not possible to make money through the website. In April 2019, he interviewed Fatih Mehmet Maçoğlu, also known as "The Communist Mayor."

When filming a video in the Hürriyet neighborhood of Adana, Çenet was detained for allegedly praising crime and criminals when trying to show off how dangerous the neighborhood was. He was released after making a statement. Çenet switched to English-language content in 2021, as it earned more money. Between April and June 2024, Çenet's channel was hacked three times and all of his videos were deleted.

In a video exploring Krubera Cave, Crimean speleologist Gennady Samokhin, who accompanied Çenet on the journey, possibly discovered a new fish species. As of 2024, it is currently being studied at the Crimean Federal University.

In April and May 2026, Çenet was filming a documentary aboard the expedition cruise ship MV Hondius, which was struck by a deadly hantavirus outbreak. Çenet had boarded the vessel as part of a documentary project aiming to visit the remote island of Tristan da Cunha. He disembarked early from the ship at Saint Helena on April 24, prior to the official identification and global announcement of the outbreak. Once the epidemic was revealed, he criticized the ship's safety response and entered self-isolation, although he never showed symptoms of the virus.

== Personal life ==
Çenet married his wife, Cansu Gizem Çenet, in August 2019. They have two children, a daughter and a son.

In December 2017, Çenet was traveling from Bursa to Istanbul on the Otoyol 5 motorway when his car crashed into a barrier after he lost control. They were taken to Orhangazi State Hospital but were discharged quickly with minor injuries. Çenet attributed the accident to a lack of sleep.

Çenet has been outspoken against the Persecution of Uyghurs in China, the Belt and Road Initiative, the Gaza genocide, and figures such as Vladimir Putin, Nicolás Maduro and Bashar al-Assad.
