= Gol Talab =

Coordinates: 23°42′35″N 90°24′18″E

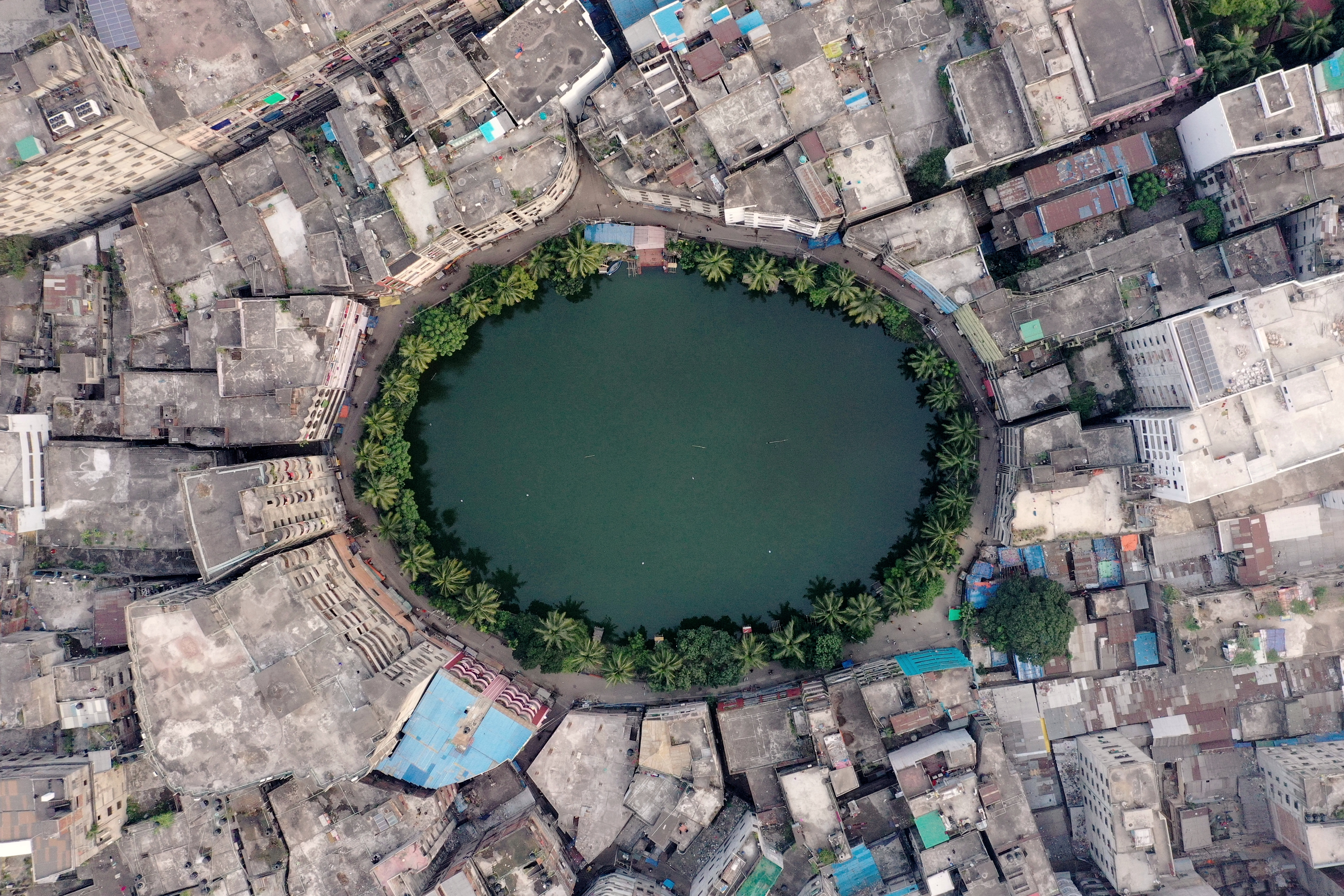
Gol Talab

Gol Talab or Gol Talaab (talab means tank) also known as Nawab Bari Pukur, is a small oval-shaped water tank/pond in Islampur, Old Dhaka, Dhaka, Bangladesh, located immediately to the north-west of the Ahsan Manzil Palace and north of the Buriganga River. Gol Talab is an official heritage site, designated by the city government of Dhaka.

== Description ==
Gol Talab dates to the 19th century. It covers an area of 2.23 acres and has a maximum depth of 23 feet (7.0 m). There are plans to upgrade it into a park. The pond is fenced. Vegetation found around the lake consist of trees of coconut, mango, neem, jackfruit and Chinese dates. Aquatic fauna reported are fish, frog, insects and others. The fish species reported are ruhi, tilapia, silver carp, pangash, katal, koi, puti and many more. Invertebrates reported are beetles, dragon flies, grasshoppers, butterflies, small birds and water scorpions. The pond has a bathing ghat only on its northwestern part. Boating competitions are held in the pond. A path for jogging and walking exists around the water.

== Scientific analysis ==
Gol Talab is one of the five ponds in Dhaka, which have a significant effect on the environmental and biodiversity of the urban climate. Field research studies have been carried out to assess its link with the environment, economy and society. The results of the socio-environmental survey, involving both quantitative and qualitative aspects, were carried out by three faculty members of the Department of Architecture, Stamford University Bangladesh.

Water quality studies of the Gol Talab indicate a degree of pollution with the following water quality parameters of: TDS of 261 mg/liter; a conductivity value of 0.528 ms/cm; pH value of 6.92; dissolved oxygen (DO) of 13.92 mg/liter; an arsenic content of less than 10 ppb; a COD values of −23 mg/liter; and BOD value of 59.4 mg per liter.

== Conservation ==
The pond is maintained by the Moulvi Khawaja Abdullah Welfare Trust and Bangladesh Water Development Board, as part of the 2000 National Water Management Plan. The pond has been cleaned up and restored as part of the water development plan. In 2008, The Daily Star reported that heritage buildings and sites were under threat in the city, including Gol Talab. In 2009 the Dhaka City Corporation reaffirmed the conservation status of 93 structures and sites in Dhaka, in consideration of their "historical, aesthetic, scientific, social, cultural, religious, political and heritage value"; Gol Talab is an official heritage site under the Dhaka Metropolitan Development Plan.
