= Ruhi =

Ruhi, also spelt Rouhi (Arabic: روحي rūḥī, rūḥiy, rūḥy) is an Arabic masculine given name in the possessive form which means "spiritual, soulful". It may refer to:

== People ==
- Ruhi Khalidi (1864–1913), Ottoman politician
- Ruhi al-Khatib (1914–1994), Palestinian politician
- Ruhi Çenet (born 1990), Turkish YouTuber
- Ruhi Sarıalp (1924–2001), Turkish track and field athlete
- Ruhi Su (1912–1985), Turkish singer
- Mustaque Ahmed Ruhi (born 1974), Bangladeshi politician

== Education ==
- Ruhi Institute, an educational institution, operating under the guidance of the National Spiritual Assembly of the Bahá'í Faith in Colombia
