= Oceanwide Expeditions =

Dutch company specializing in voyages to Antarctica and the Arctic

- Company type: Tour Operator
- Industry: Tourism
- Founded: 1993
- Headquarters: Vlissingen, Netherlands
- Products: Expedition Cruise Tours
- Website: www.oceanwide-expeditions.com

Oceanwide Expeditions is a Dutch company specializing in expedition-style voyages to Antarctica and the Arctic. Oceanwide owns and operates a fleet of ice-strengthened vessels, and provides small-scale tours that provide passengers close contact with polar wildlife, landscapes, and historical sites. A range of activities is also available to passengers both on land and at sea.

In addition to both polar regions, Oceanwide Expedition also offers expedition cruise itineraries visiting several sub-Antarctic islands, including South Georgia and the South Sandwich Islands. Other destinations include Gough Island, Tristan da Cunha, Inaccessible Island, Nightingale Island, and Saint Helena.

== History ==
=== 20th century: Foundation ===
Oceanwide Expeditions has its foundations in scientific research and the Dutch Plancius Foundation. The Plancius Foundation began at the Arctic Centre at the University of Groningen, which launched a research program investigating 17th-century Dutch whaling around Spitsbergen, the largest island of the Svalbard archipelago. With Arctic archaeology professor Louwrens Hacquebord leading the initiative, the ship Pollox was purchased in 1979 and renamed Plancius (not to be confused with the current MV Plancius operated by Oceanwide Expeditions), to accommodate research around the former Dutch settlement of Smeerenburg.

In 1983, the Plancius Foundation was the first operator to organize yearly polar expedition cruises to the Arctic archipelago of Svalbard combining tourism with scientific research.

=== 21st century: Expansion ===
The MV Plancius was purchased in 2010. The MV Ortelius and SV Rembrandt van Rijn were acquired in 2012. In 2016, the MV Hondius was ordered. It was completed and launched in 2019.

==== 2020s ====
From 2024, the company started offering a remote Weddell Sea itinerary, exploring additional regions of the Weddell Sea including the Luitpold Coast and Queen Maud Land.

In December 2024, graffiti was discovered on a historic building in Whalers Bay, part of the former British Base B. On behalf of the UK Antarctic Heritage Trust, Oceanwide Expeditions successfully organised a cleanup and restoration operation in January 2025. This was supported by the British Antarctic Survey, the International Association of Antarctica Tour Operators (IAATO), and the Foreign, Commonwealth and Development Office (FCDO).

In February 2025, MV Ortelius set a new record for the most southerly position ever achieved by a passenger vessel in the Weddell Sea. In 2026, the company repeated this, setting a new farthest south position in the Weddell Sea.

In March 2026, Oceanwide Expeditions announced the signing of a Letter of Intent for the construction and delivery of two eco-sail vessels. Both vessels will feature hybrid sail propulsion systems, and be built from the ground up with sustainable tourism in mind. The vessels, with a capacity of 146 passengers each, are expected to join the existing Oceanwide Expeditions fleet from 2029.

In April and May 2026, three passengers died, one is in intensive care in a South African hospital, and three people on the cruise ship have shown symptoms, after a hantavirus outbreak on MV Hondius, that left Ushuaia, Argentina on 1 April 2026. Hantavirus was initially confirmed in two passengers, with suspected cases in seven passengers. The outbreak continued to spread as the ship continued on its planned course. On 11 April, a Dutch man died on board, and almost two weeks later his body was taken off the ship at St Helena accompanied by his wife, aged 69, who was evacuated to South Africa, where she died in a Johannesburg hospital, having had hantavirus, since confirmed by the World Health Organization. On 27 April a British passenger fell sick and was evacuated to South Africa, in a critical but stable condition with hantavirus. On 2 May 2026, a German national died, the third fatality, currently without confirmation of hantavirus. They have since been let off the ship to receive medical care.

== Awards and recognition ==
- Five-time winner of World's Leading Polar Expedition Operator Award
- Two-time winner of Puffin Award by AECO
- Best Expedition Cruise Operator for the Polar Regions (Expedition Cruise Network Awards 2024)
- Best Expedition Cruise Operator for Sustainability (Expedition Cruise Network Awards 2024)
- Best Medium Expedition Cruise Operator (Expedition Cruise Network Awards 2024)
- Favorite Expedition Cruise Operator for the Polar Regions (Expedition Cruise Network Awards 2025)
- Favorite Expedition Cruise Operator for Sustainability (Expedition Cruise Network Awards 2025)
- Favorite Expedition Cruise Operator Overall (Expedition Cruise Network Awards 2025)

== Partnerships ==
Oceanwide Expeditions works closely with organizations that support the preservation of natural habitats and sustainable environmental conditions. In the Arctic, these entities include the Association of Arctic Expedition Cruise Operators (AECO). In Antarctica, Oceanwide Expeditions works with International Association of Antarctic Tour Operators (IAATO).

== Expedition fleet ==
Oceanwide Expeditions operates four vessels of various nautical classes: sailing vessel s/v Rembrandt van Rijn, former Royal Dutch Navy oceanographic research vessel MV Plancius, former Russian Academy of Science vessel MV Ortelius, and Polar Class 6 vessel MV Hondius. All vessels are equipped with Zodiac Milpro RIBs for ship-to-shore landings, while Ortelius is also outfitted with a helipad for helicopter transport in the Weddell sea.

On board, an expedition guide team, composed of experts in a range of disciplines including biology, glaciology, history, and photography are led by an expedition leader. Additional activity-focused guides are also present, including specialised hiking, kayaking, diving and mountaineering guides.

Active Fleet Vessels
| Name | Construction Year | Active Since | Passenger Capacity | Ice-class |
|---|---|---|---|---|
| Hondius | 2019 | 2019 | 170 | Polar Class 6 (1A-Super) |
| Ortelius | 1989 | 2012 | 108 | Ice-strengthened hull (Constructed to UL1 specifications) |
| Plancius | 1976 | 2010 | 108 | 1D |
| Rembrandt van Rijn | 1947 | 2012 | 33 | Ice-strengthened hull (limited to Greenlandic and Svalbard waters) |

== Destinations ==
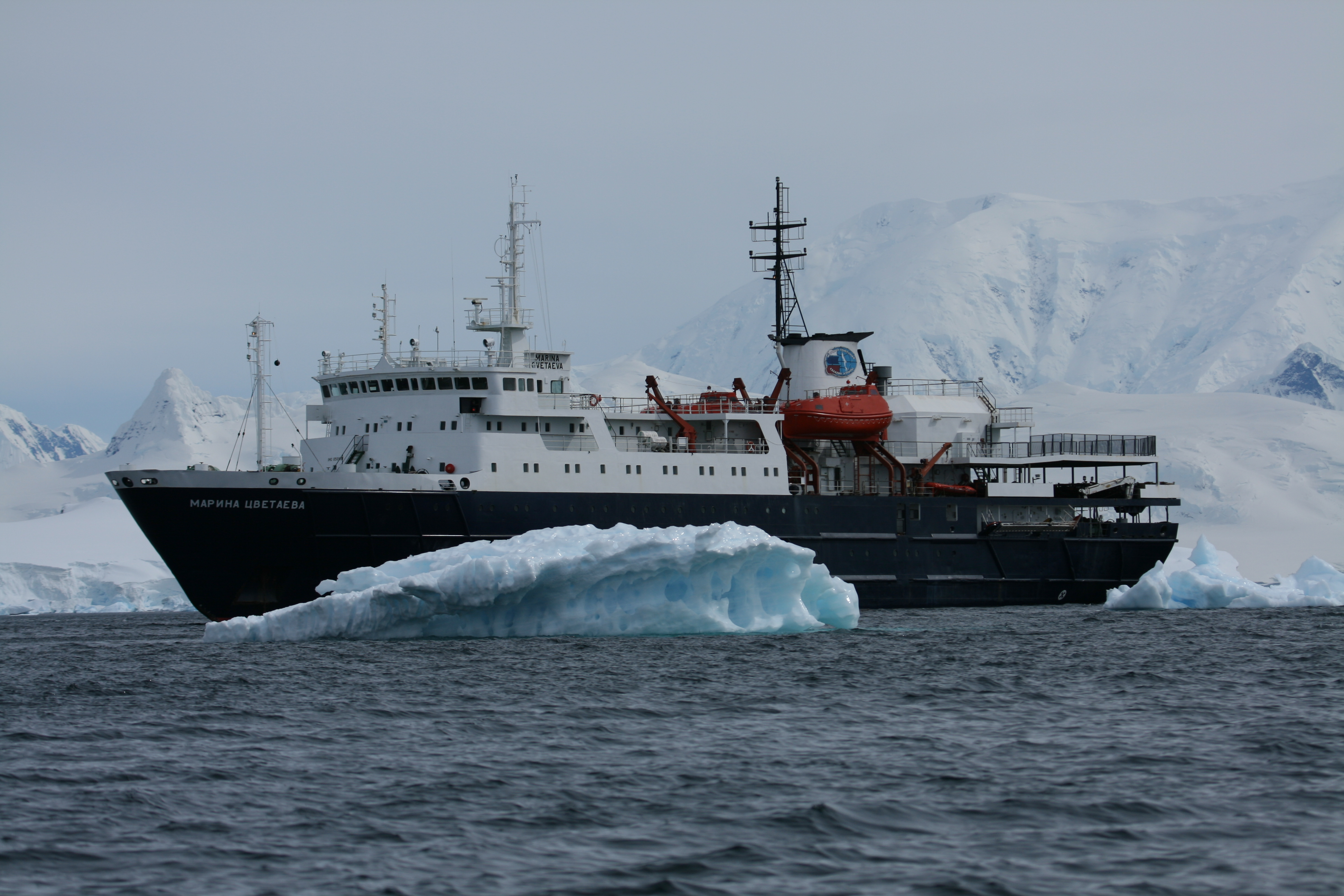
MV Ortelius in Antarctica

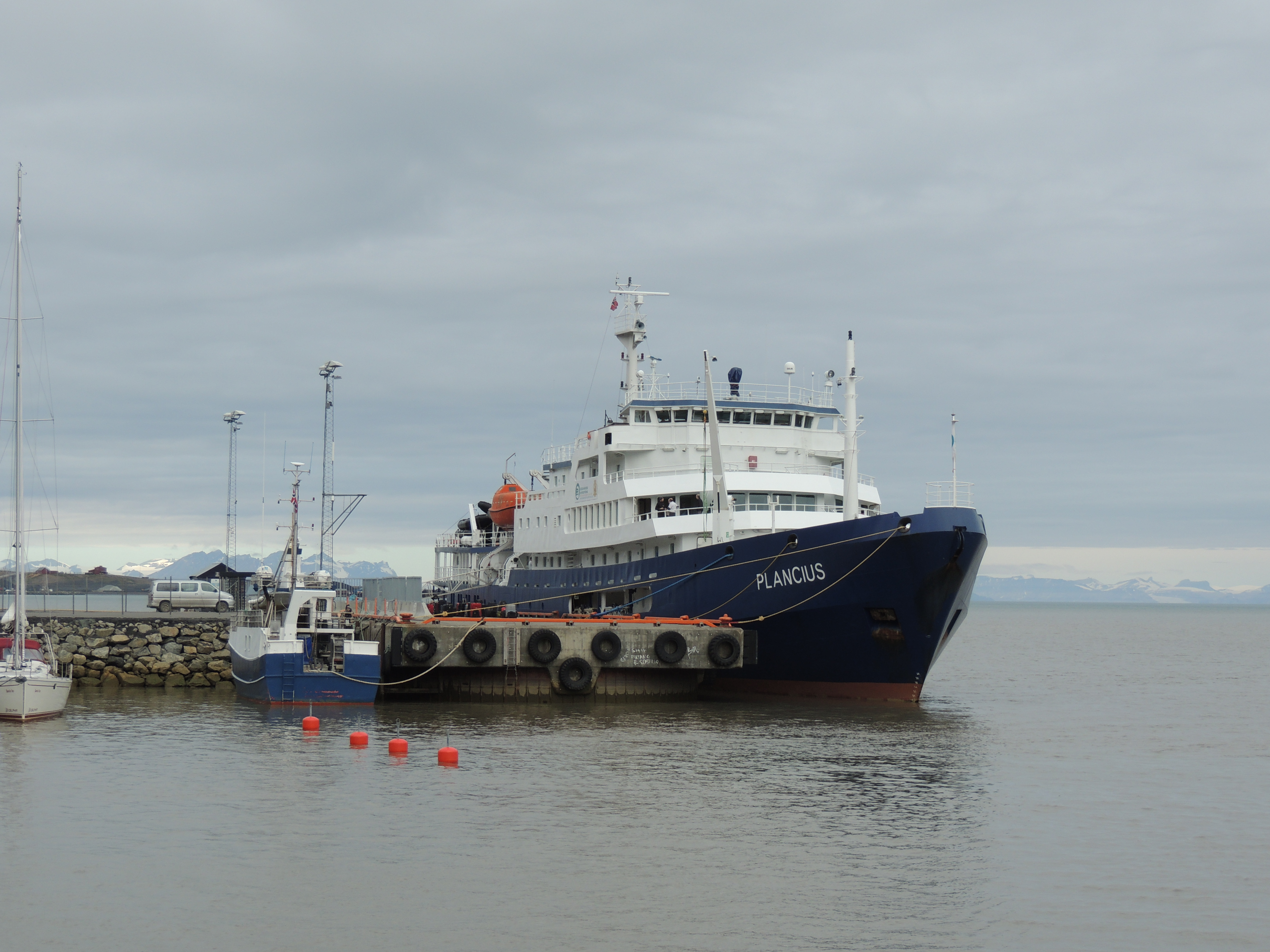
MV Plancius in Longyearbyen

Oceanwide Expeditions operates an Arctic and Antarctic program across two distinct seasons. The Arctic program runs from May to October. The Antarctic program typically runs from November to March. In addition, isolated islands in the South and North Atlantic may be visited during select itineraries. All three of the company's motor vessels operate in both the Arctic and Antarctica. Rembrandt van Rijn is classed only to operate in Icelandic and Greenlandic waters, as well as those of the Svalbard archipelago.

== See also ==
- Professor Molchanov
- MV Antarctic Dream
