= HNLMS Tydeman (A906) =

Dutch naval research and cruise ship

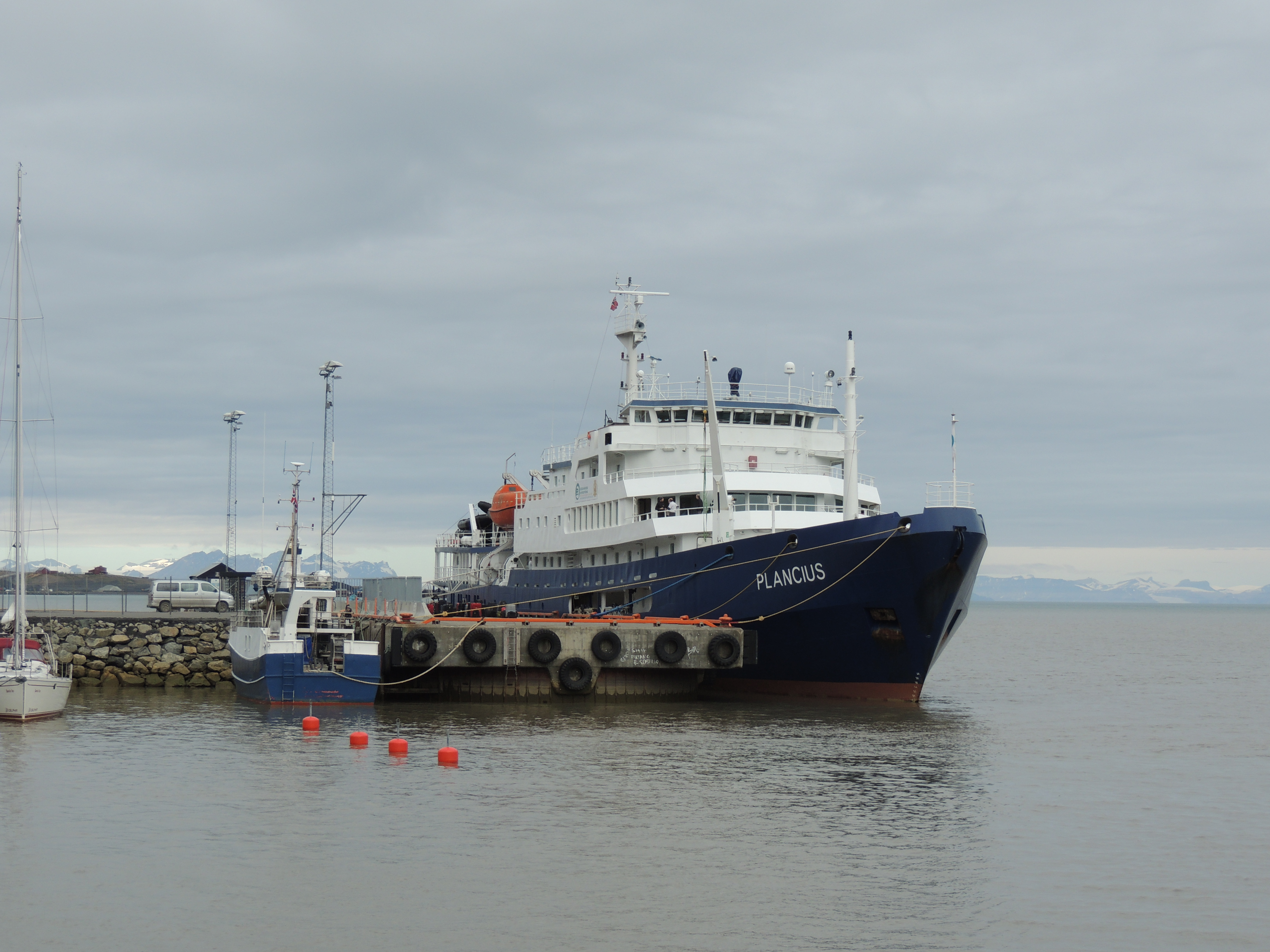
- Plancius in Longyearbyen on 12 July 2013

History

Netherlands
- Name: Tydeman
- Namesake: Gustaaf Frederik Tydeman
- Ordered: October 1974
- Builder: Scheepswerf "De Merwede", Hardinxveld-Giessendam
- Yard number: 612
- Laid down: 29 April 1975
- Launched: 18 December 1975
- Commissioned: 10 November 1976
- Decommissioned: June 2004
- Identification: Pennant number: A906; IMO number: 7432044
- Fate: Sold to tour operator Oceanwide Expeditions

History
- Name: Plancius
- Owner: Oceanwide Expeditions
- Port of registry: Netherlands
- Acquired: 2009
- Identification: IMO number: 7432044; MMSI number: 246573000; Callsign: PBQK
- Status: In service

General characteristics (as Tydeman)
- Type: Oceanographic research vessel
- Displacement: 2,977 t (2,930 long tons) fully loaded
- Length: 90.2 m (295 ft 11 in)
- Beam: 14.4 m (47 ft 3 in)
- Draught: 4.8 m (15 ft 9 in)
- Installed power: 3 Diesel-electric units, 2,040 kW (2,730 hp)
- Propulsion: 3 × Stork-Werkspoor 8-FCHD-240 diesel engines, 1 × shaft, active rudder, 2 × bow thrusters
- Speed: 15 knots (28 km/h; 17 mph)
- Complement: maximum 62 plus 15 scientists
- Sensors & processing systems: Atlas DESO-10 echo sounder, EDO-Western type 515 deep sea echo sounder, ELAC-Mittellodar wreckage sonar, Geometrics G-801 magnetometer

MV Plancius, formerly HNLMS Tydeman (A906), is a renovated oceanographic research vessel of the Royal Netherlands Navy now employed as a polar expedition cruise vessel by owner and operator Oceanwide Expeditions. She was commissioned into the Royal Netherlands Navy on 10 November 1976, and served until 2004, before being renovated for commercial use. The vessel was used for both military and civilian research and had a fracture zone named after it.

== Design and description ==
Designed for oceanographic and hydrographic research, Tydeman measures 90.2 metres (295 ft 11 in) long with a beam of 14.4 m (47 ft 3 in) and a draught of 4.8 m (15 ft 9 in). In naval service the vessel had a fully loaded displacement of 2,977 tonnes (2,930 long tons). (Note: Couhat has the dimensions as 90.15 m (295 ft 9 in) long, with a 14.43 m (47 ft 4 in) beam and a 4.75 m (15 ft 7 in) draught. The ship's fully loaded displacement is 3,000 t (3,000 long tons).) The ship is powered by a diesel-electric system composed of three Stork-Werkspoor 8-FCHD-240 diesel engines and one motor turning one shaft creating 2,040 kilowatts (2,730 hp). Any two of the three diesel engines power the propulsion while the third engine powers the ship. The vessel also mounts a Paxman diesel engine creating 362 kW (485 hp), an active rudder creating 220 kW (300 hp) and two bow thrusters creating 360 kW (480 hp). This gives the vessel a maximum speed of 15 knots (28 km/h; 17 mph) and a range of 15,700 nautical miles (29,100 km; 18,100 mi) at 10.3 knots (19.1 km/h; 11.9 mph) or 10,300 nmi (19,100 km; 11,900 mi) at 13.5 knots (25.0 km/h; 15.5 mph).

Tydeman was designed for military and civilian research and had a maximum complement of 62 including 8 officers with an additional 15 civilians. The vessel had six laboratories and mounted a flight deck and hangar large enough to operate small helicopters. (Note: Couhat states the vessel had eight laboratories.) In naval service, the ship had a forward working deck with a wet hall and midships and aft working decks, along with diving facilities and two container spaces for 6.1 m (20 ft) standard shipping containers. The ship has passive stabilisation and can operate oceanographic cables to depths of 7,000 m (23,000 ft). The vessel was equipped with Atlas DESO-10 echo sounders, EDO-Western type 515 deep sea echo sounder, ELAC-Mittellodar wreckage sonar, Geometrics G-801 magnetometer, bottom diggers, radiosondes, barometers and Kelvin Hughes, hull-mounted side-scan sonar. The vessel mounted one 10-ton crane and one 4-ton crane with frames.

== Construction and career ==
=== Dutch service ===
Ordered in October 1974, the vessel was constructed for the Royal Netherlands Navy by BV de Merwede at their yard in Hardinxveld-Giessendam, Netherlands, and the keel was laid down on 29 April 1975 with the yard number 612. The vessel was launched on 18 December 1975 and commissioned on 10 November 1976. The vessel was named after Vice Admiral Gustaaf Frederik Tydeman, a hydrographer of the Siboga Expedition (1899–1900) in the Dutch East Indies. Used for civilian and military research, the vessel became the namesake of the Tydeman fracture zone (36°N 23°W), between Madeira and the Azores which was part of the project investigating the area in 1977.

From March 1991 to March 1992, Tydeman trialled a derivative version of the Thomson-Sintra DUBM 41 towed sonar system. This was followed by a major refit from April to November 1992 at the aan der Giessen-Noord shipyard. From 1996 to 1997, the research ship trialled the TSM 2670 2-ton active low-frequency sonar body and passive towed sonar array. The ship was taken out of service in June 2004.

=== Post naval career ===
After retiring from naval service, the vessel was acquired by Oceanwide Expeditions and in 2009, the ship was converted to a passenger/cruise ship. The vessel returned to service in 2009, with a 3,434 gross tonnage (GT) and 700 tons deadweight (DWT). The vessel was ice-strengthened, rated at 1D and accommodates 108 passengers. The vessel 40 cabins measuring 12.5 m^{2} (135 sq ft) and 10 cabins measuring 21 m^{2} (230 sq ft). The vessel carries 10 zodiacs and a crew of 37. Tydeman was renamed Plancius and sails under the Dutch flag, used for cruises to the Arctic and Antarctica.
