= MV Ortelius =

Ice-strengthened vessel owned and operated by Oceanwide Expeditions

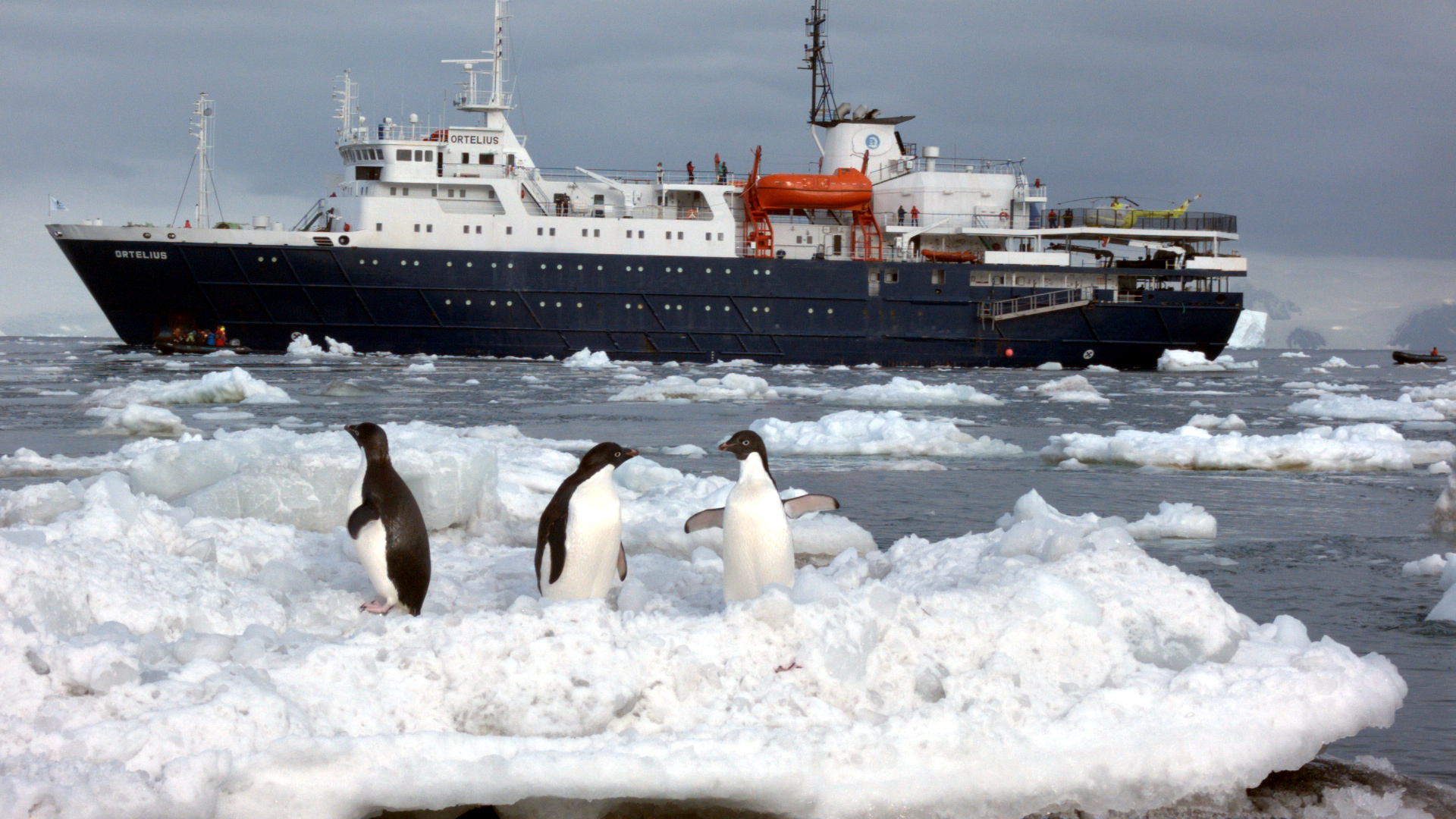
- MV Ortelius anchored at Cape Adare

History

Russia
- Name: Marina Svetaeva
- Namesake: Marina Tsvetaeva
- Owner: LLC RN-Sakhalinmorneftegaz
- Port of registry: Korsakov, Russia
- Builder: Stocznia Gdynia, Gdynia, Poland
- Launched: 22 December 1988
- Identification: IMO number: 8509181; Call sign: UFKU
- Fate: Sold, 1999

Russia
- Name: Marina Svetaeva
- Namesake: Marina Tsvetaeva
- Owner: Marine Company Sakhalin-Kurils LLC
- Port of registry: Kholmsk, Russia
- Acquired: 1999
- Identification: IMO number: 8509181; Call sign: UFKU
- Fate: Sold, 2011

Netherlands
- Name: Ortelius
- Namesake: Abraham Ortelius
- Owner: Oceanwide Expeditions, Vlissingen, Netherlands
- Port of registry: Vlissingen, Netherlands
- Acquired: 2011
- Identification: Call sign: 5BMC3; MMSI number: 209778000
- Status: In service

General characteristics
- Type: Cruise ship
- Tonnage: 4,575 GT; 1,417 NT; 804 DWT
- Length: 91.25 m (299 ft 5 in) o/a; 78.45 m (257 ft 5 in) p/p
- Beam: 17.61 m (57 ft 9 in)
- Draught: 5.8 m (19 ft 0 in)
- Ice class: 1A
- Installed power: Sulzer 6ZL40/48
- Speed: 14.3 knots (26.5 km/h; 16.5 mph)
- Capacity: 100 passengers
- Crew: 41
- Aircraft carried: 2 × Squirrel 350 or Bell 206 LongRanger helicopters
- Aviation facilities: Helipad and hangar (added 2007)

MV Ortelius is an ice-strengthened vessel currently employed for expedition-style polar cruises by owner and operator Oceanwide Expeditions. She was originally named Marina Svetaeva and was built in Gdynia, Poland, in 1989 as a special-purpose vessel for the LLC RN-Sakhalinmorneftegaz.

The ship operated in the Russian Far East for the Marine Company Sakhalin-Kurils LLC, as a passenger and supply vessel, then as an accommodation and supply ship to oil fields in the northern Pacific Ocean. In December 2007, she was chartered by Aurora Expeditions of Sydney, Australia, as a cruise ship in the Arctic and Antarctic seas.

Marina Svetaeva was acquired in 2011 by the Dutch company Oceanwide Expeditions, based in Vlissingen, Netherlands. She was renamed Ortelius and registered in Cyprus.

On 16 January 2014, Ortelius was scheduled to sail for a 10-day Antarctic Peninsula voyage. All passengers were aboard, but the anchor system failed and the boat never left port. This technical problem was soon solved, however, and Ortelius continued her Antarctic season as planned. A highlight of that particular season was a successful expedition to Snow Hill Island, where passengers were transported by helicopter to a colony of emperor penguins and their chicks.

== Gallery ==
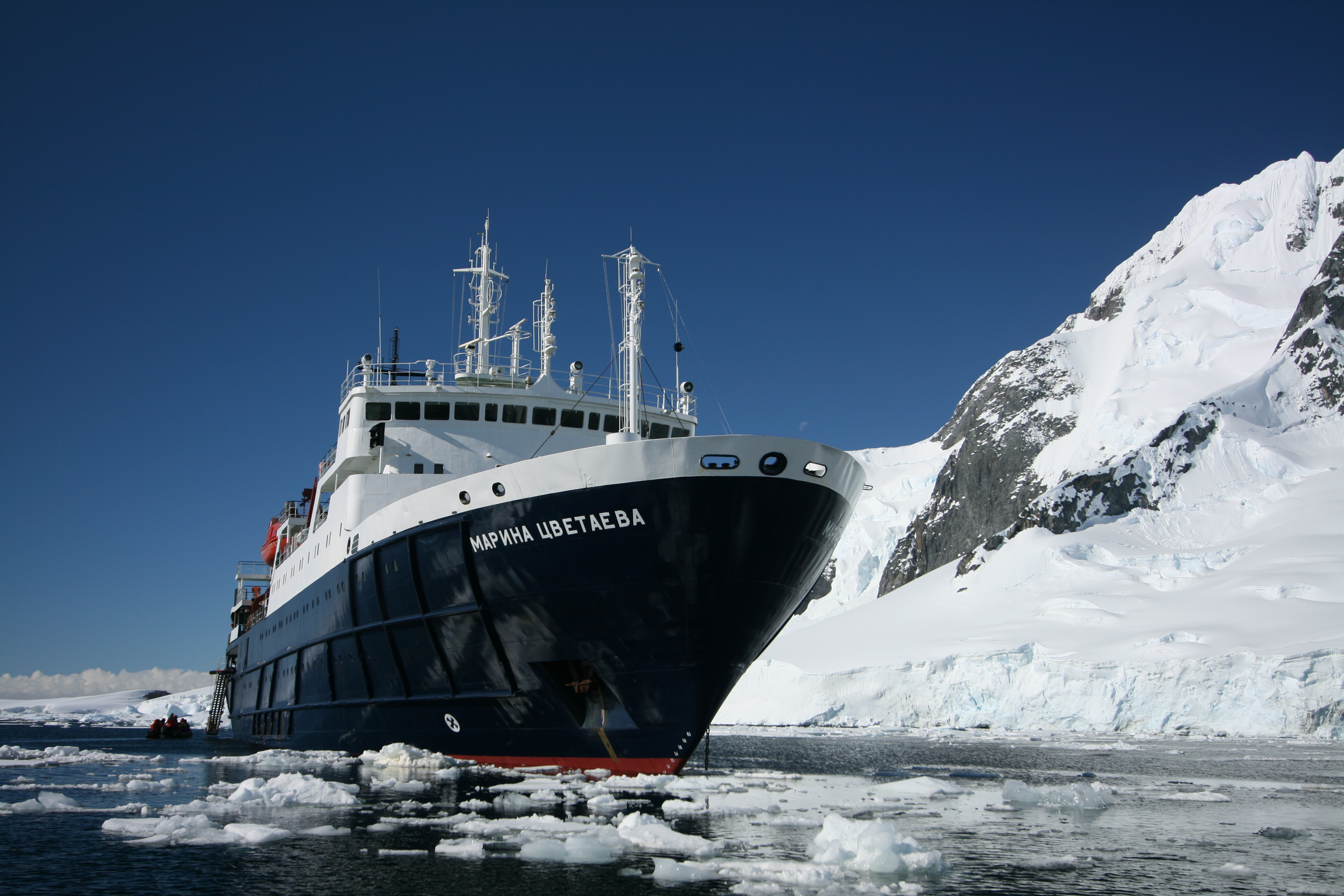

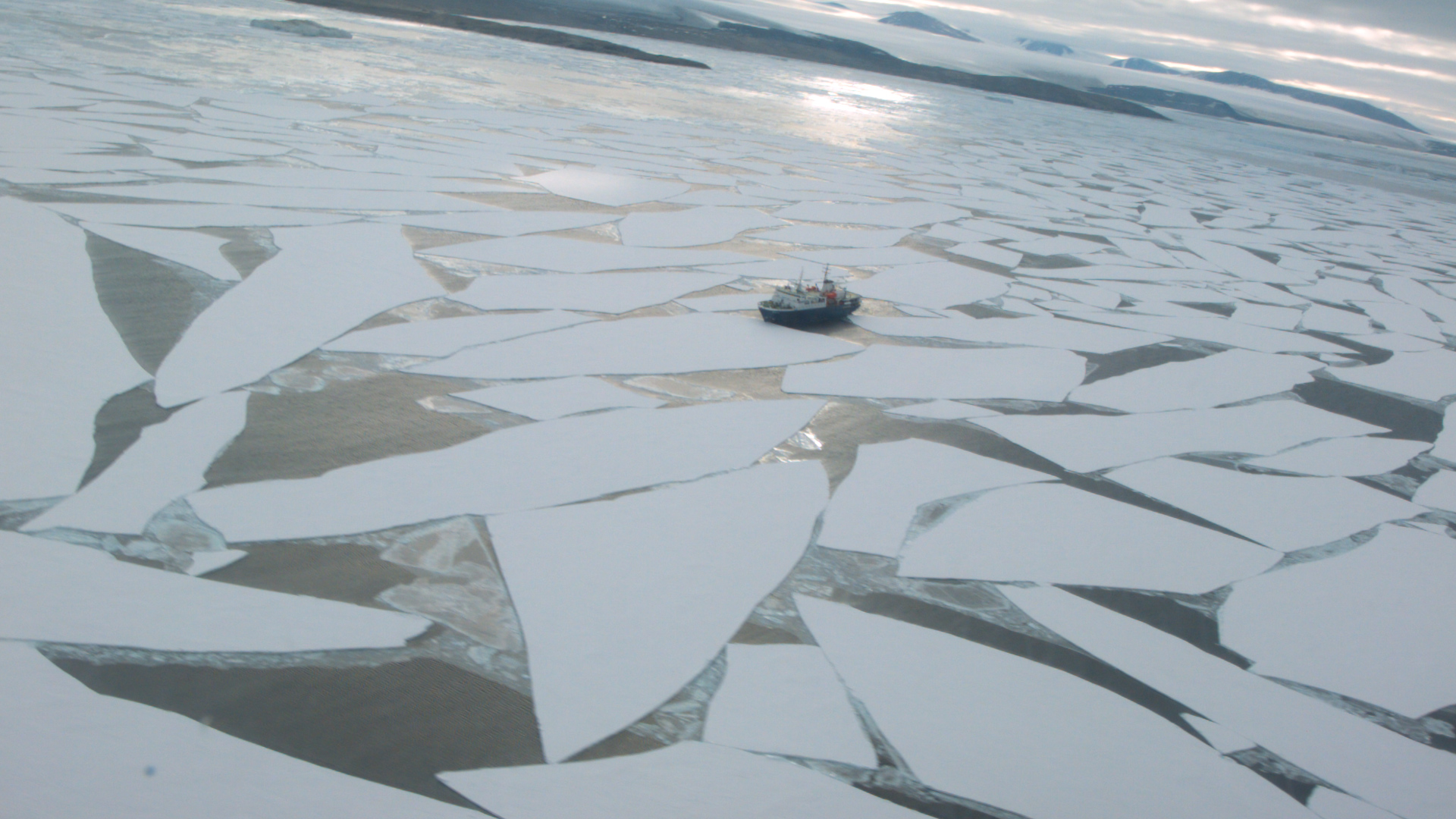

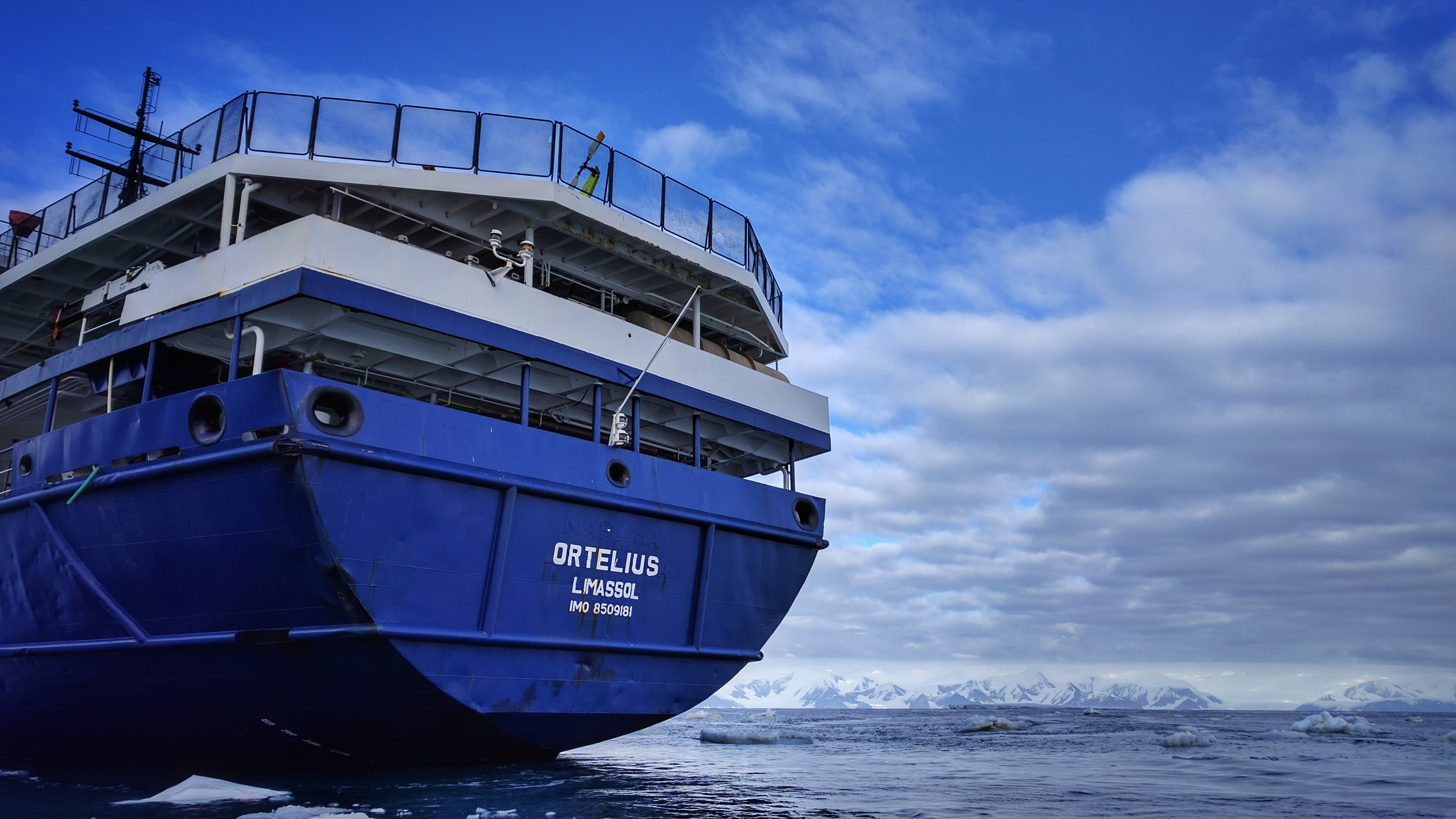

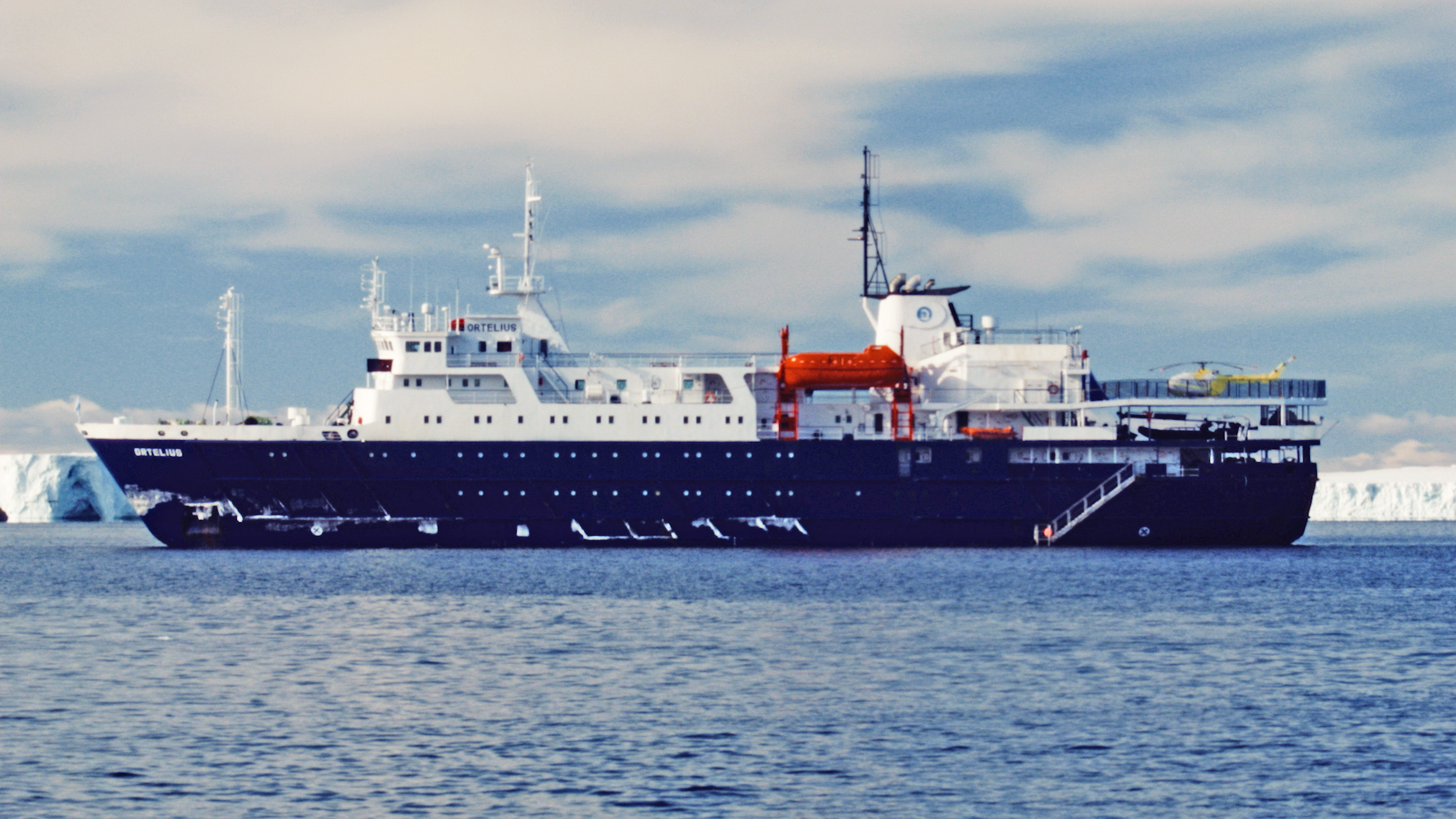
