= Port of Granadilla =

Tenerife port

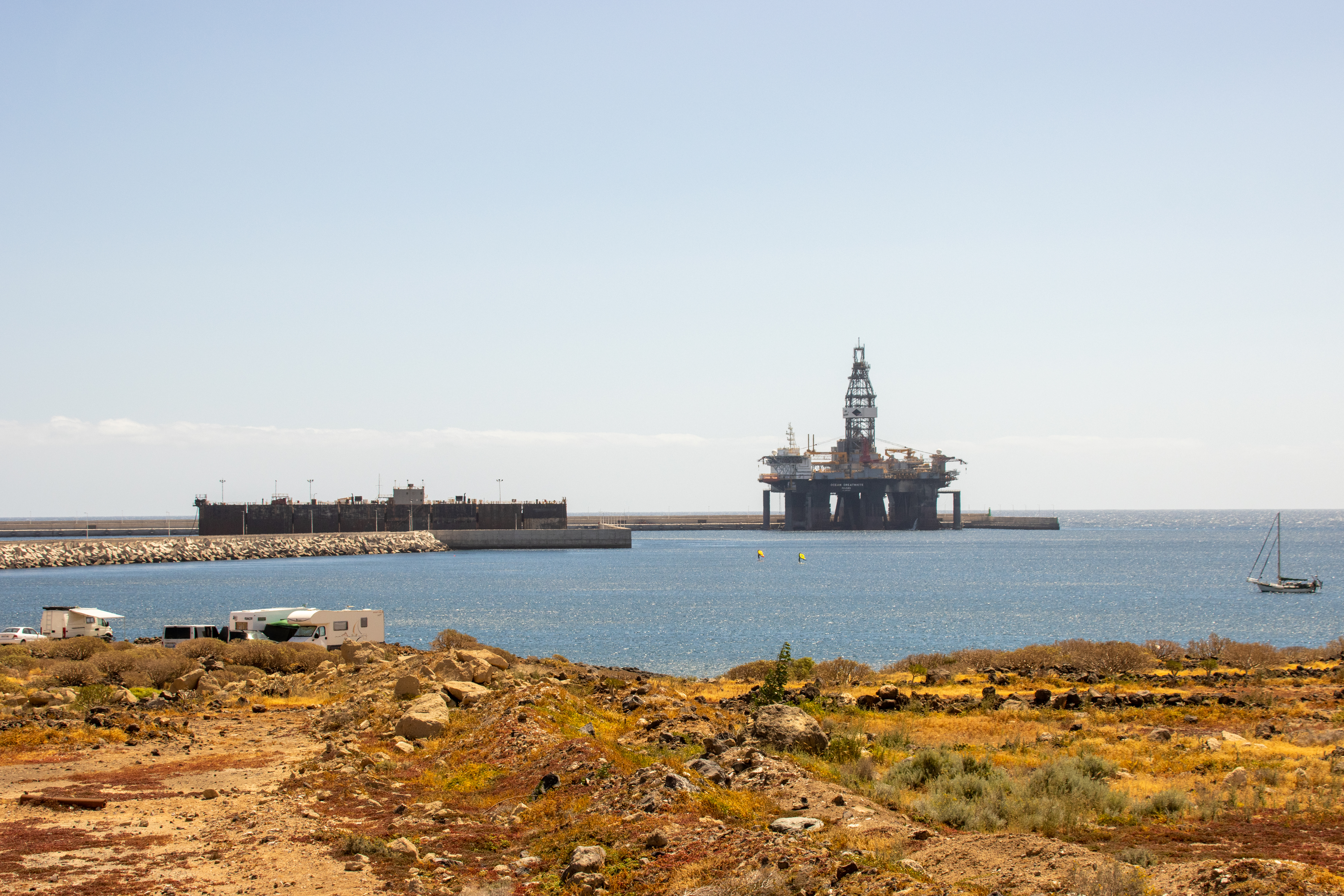
Port of Granadilla

The Port of Granadilla (Spanish: Puerto Industrial de Granadilla) is a port located in the municipality of Granadilla de Abona in the southeastern part of the island of Tenerife, Spain. It is a complementary project to the port of Santa Cruz de Tenerife and intended to provide the necessary facilities for various types of traffic, attract new traffic, and handle increasing demand. It is the largest industrial port of the Canary Islands.

== Characteristics ==
The port has a contradique length of 1,150 metres. The Exterior Dock extends longitudinally 2,512 metres. The Muelle de Ribera has 160 metres with a draft of sixteen metres and an associated esplanade of approximately fifteen hectares.

The second section of the Ribera dock is currently under construction, which will result in the materialization of another 160 metres of quay. It is expected that the port can count on a regasification plant in the year 2020.

With the entry into operation of the Port of Granadilla, the Port Authority of Santa Cruz de Tenerife manages six ports of general interest for this maritime province; those of Santa Cruz de Tenerife, Los Cristianos and Granadilla on the island of Tenerife, and those of San Sebastián de La Gomera, Santa Cruz de La Palma and La Estaca, the latter on the island of El Hierro.

== History ==
In 2004, the Port Utilization Plan of the Port of Granadilla was approved by Ministerial Order. In 2006, the European Commission issued a favorable opinion on the execution of the port.

Later there would be several delays in the work. In November 2017, the Ministry of Development issued a favorable report for the opening of the port infrastructure of Granadilla to begin receiving its first berths.

The port of Granadilla received its first docking on 21 November that year, with the scale of the platform called "West Leo" of the multinational Seadrill, this floating platform came from Avondale Shipyard, on the Mississippi River, southern United States.

The port was officially inaugurated on 2 March 2018 by the President of the Government of Spain, Mariano Rajoy.
