= Malbrán Institute =

Medical research institute in Argentina

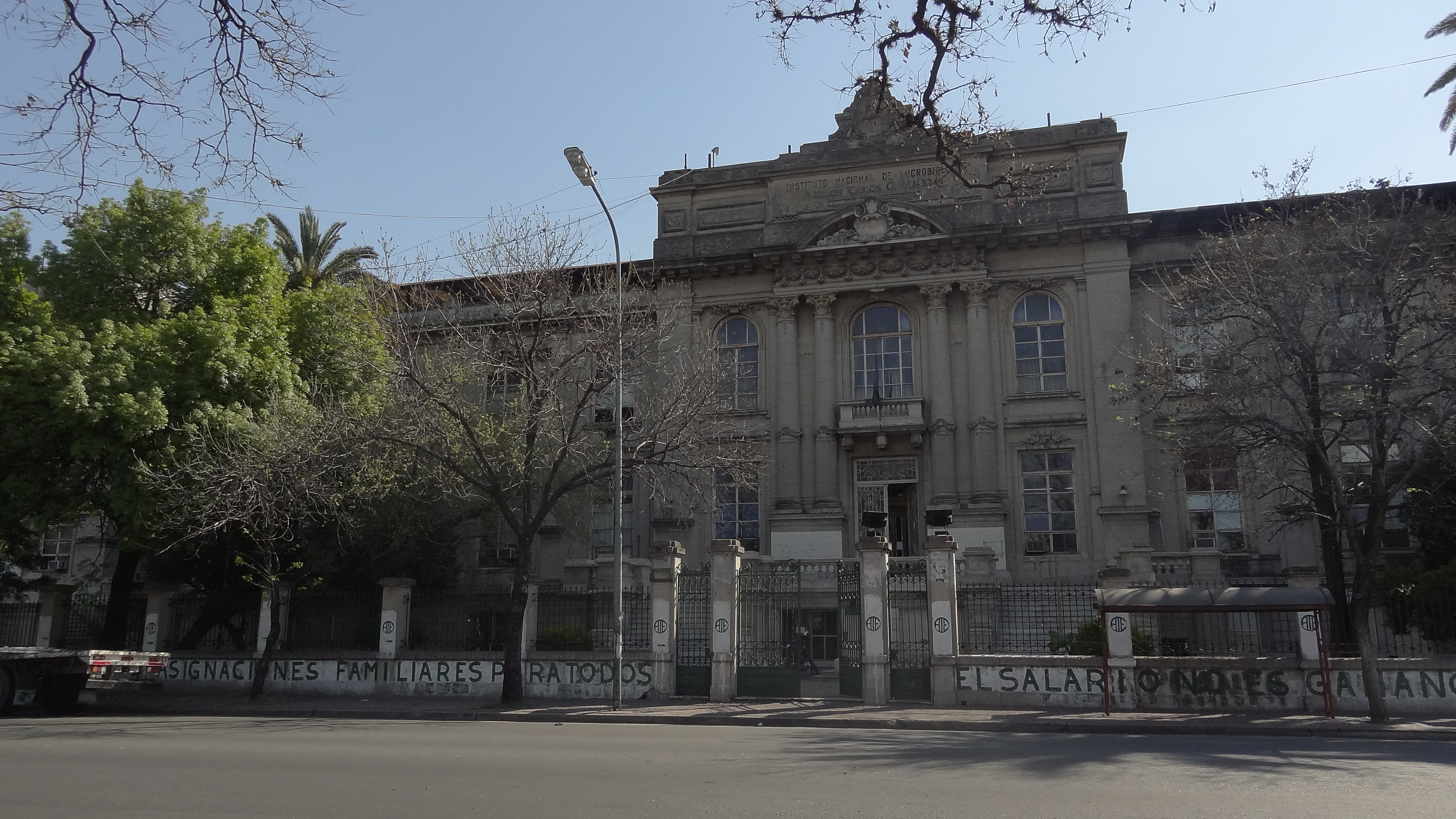
Headquarters of Malbrán Institute in Barracas

The Malbrán Institute (officially in Spanish: Administración Nacional de Laboratorios e Institutos de Salud) is a public organism dependent on the Ministry of Health of Argentina. Its function is developing scientific and technical policies for the public health of the country.

The institute has a series of laboratories around Argentina specialized in pathology and microbiology and also prevention of diseases. Known personnel who worked there include Nobel Prize laureates César Milstein and Bernardo Houssay.

The creation of the institute was a proposal of Carlos Malbrán, for whom it owes the name, after an epidemic of yellow fever in Buenos Aires in 1916. The 2000 pesos Argentinian banknote issued in 2023 show the headquarters of Malbran Institute in the neighborhood of Barracas, Buenos Aires, making tribute of the Argentine public health system after the COVID-19 pandemic.
