= MV Hondius =

Dutch expedition cruise ship

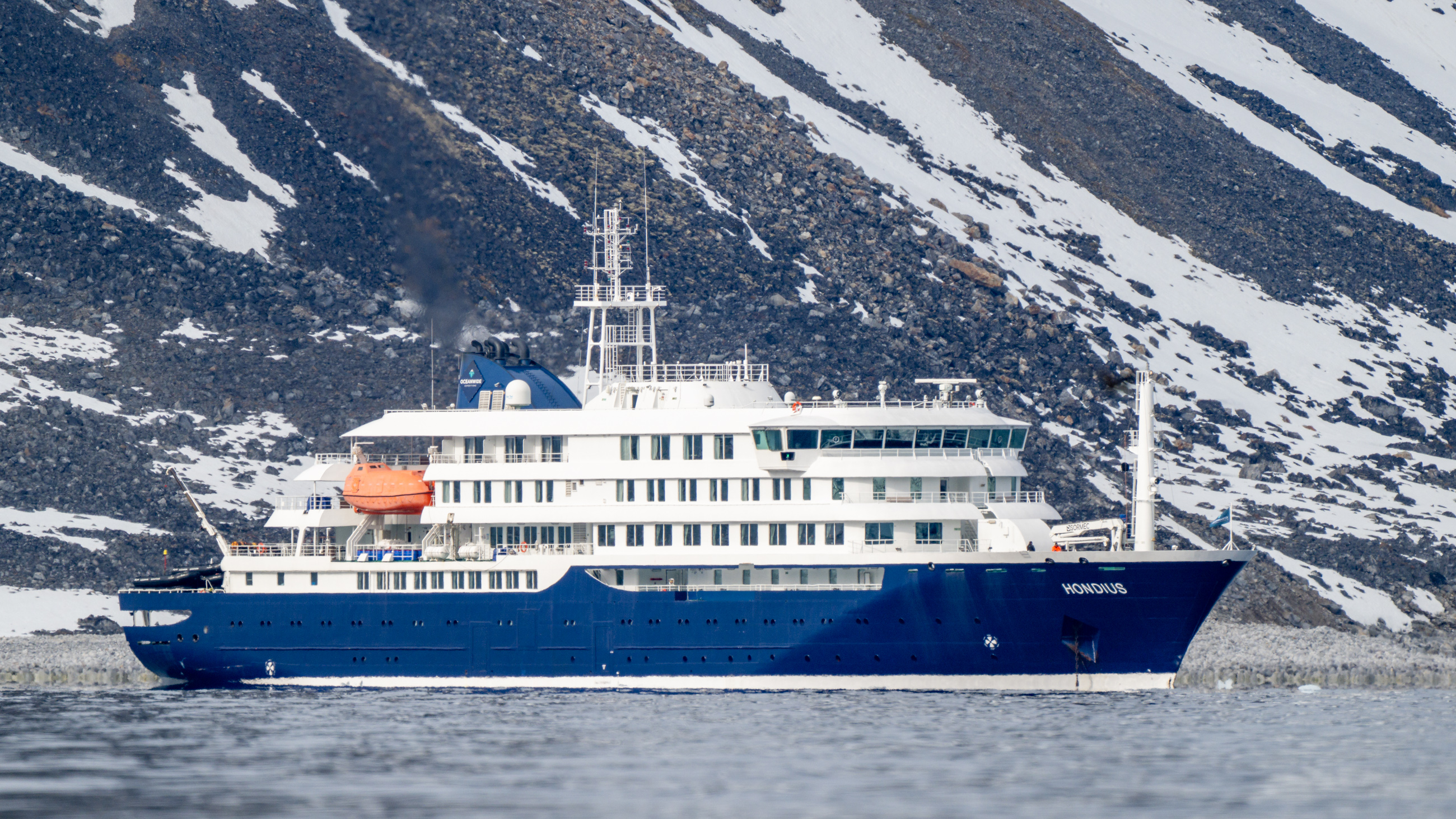
- MV Hondius at Spitsbergen in June 2025

History
- Name: Hondius
- Namesake: Jodocus Hondius
- Owner: Oceanwide Expeditions
- Port of registry: Vlissingen, Netherlands
- Ordered: 8 November 2016
- Builder: Brodosplit (Split, Croatia)
- Cost: ~€100 million
- Yard number: 484
- Laid down: 11 December 2017
- Launched: 10 June 2018
- Completed: 22 May 2019
- Maiden voyage: 3 June 2019
- In service: 2019–present
- Identification: Call sign: PCEP; IMO number: 9818709; MMSI number: 244327000
- Status: In service

General characteristics
- Type: Expedition cruise ship
- Tonnage: 6,603 GT; 2,057 NT; 1,154 DWT
- Displacement: 5,633 t (5,544 long tons)
- Length: 107.6 m (353 ft 0 in)
- Beam: 17.6 m (57 ft 9 in)
- Draught: 5.36 m (17 ft 7 in)
- Ice class: Polar Class 6
- Installed power: 2 × ABC 12DZC (2 × 2,130 kW)
- Propulsion: Single shaft; controllable pitch propeller
- Speed: 15 knots (28 km/h; 17 mph)
- Capacity: 170 passengers in 80 cabins
- Crew: 57 crew; 13 guides; 1 doctor

MV Hondius is a Dutch expedition cruise ship owned by Oceanwide Expeditions. Built by Brodosplit in Split, Croatia, the vessel entered service in 2019 and operates primarily in the Arctic and Antarctic regions. According to the owner, the Hondius is the world's first-registered Polar Class 6 ice-strengthened cruise ship.

The ship received worldwide news coverage in May 2026 following reports of eleven hantavirus infections among passengers and crew aboard, and several more cases were suspected.

== Description ==
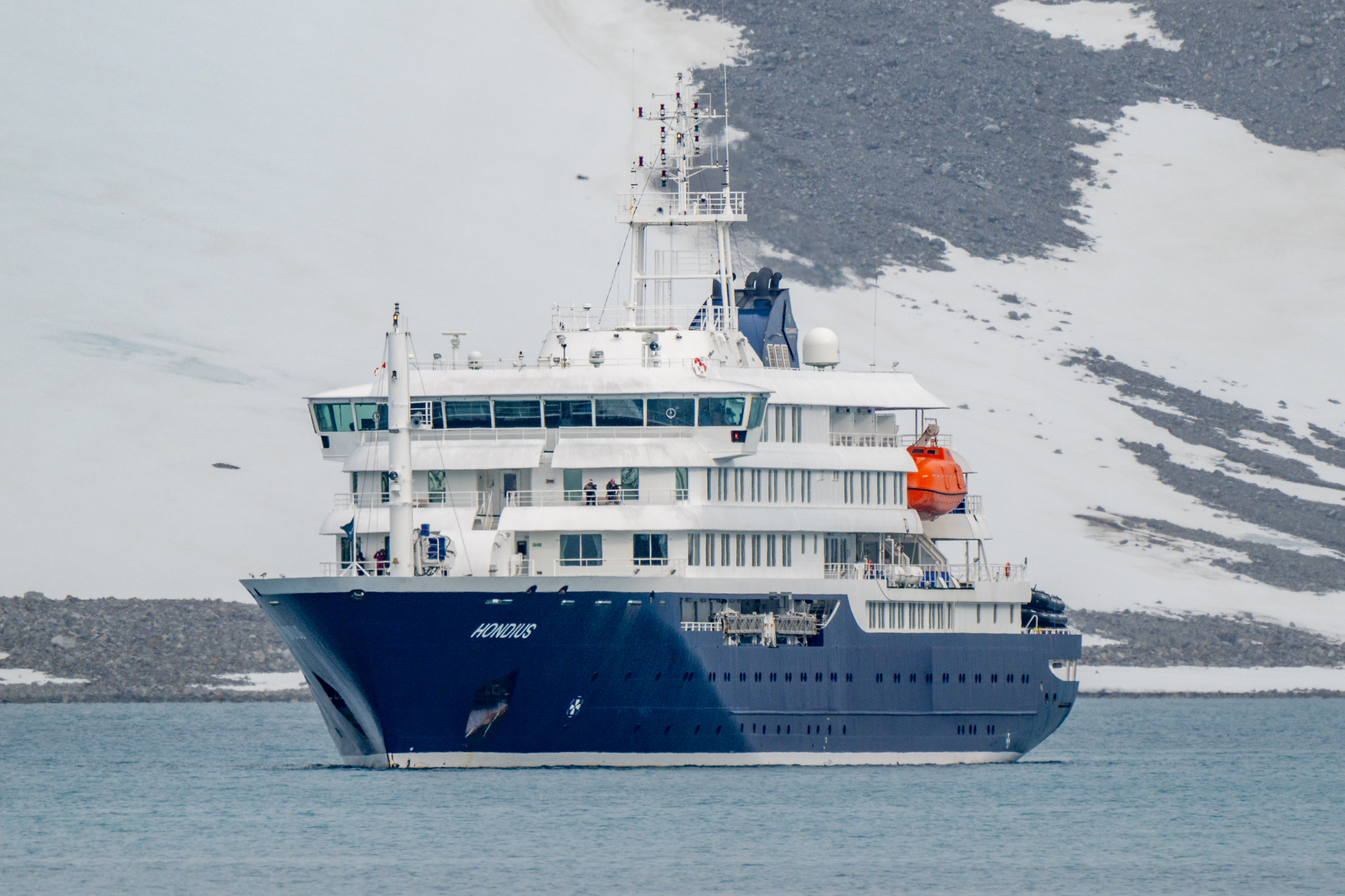
Bow

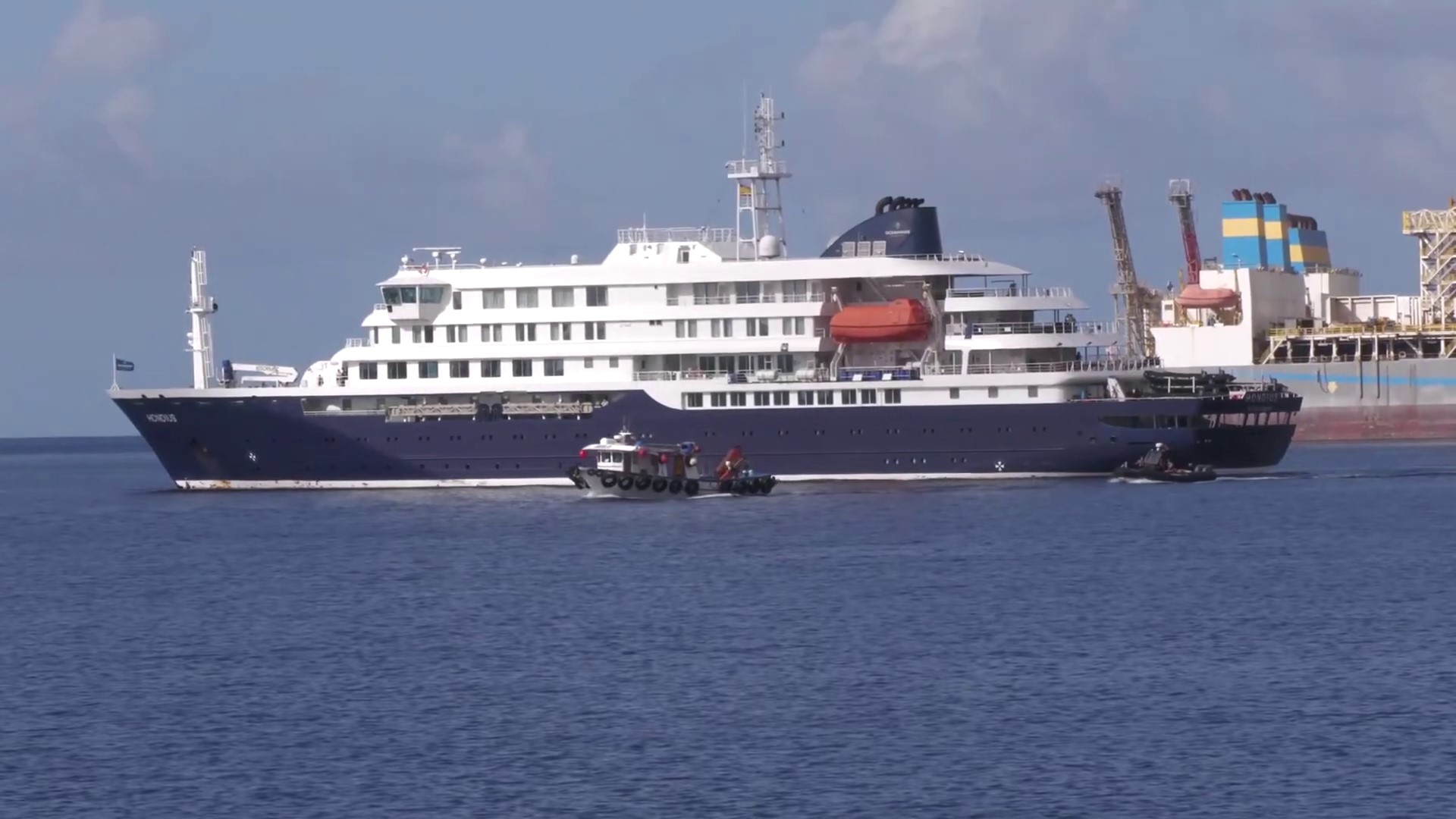
Port side

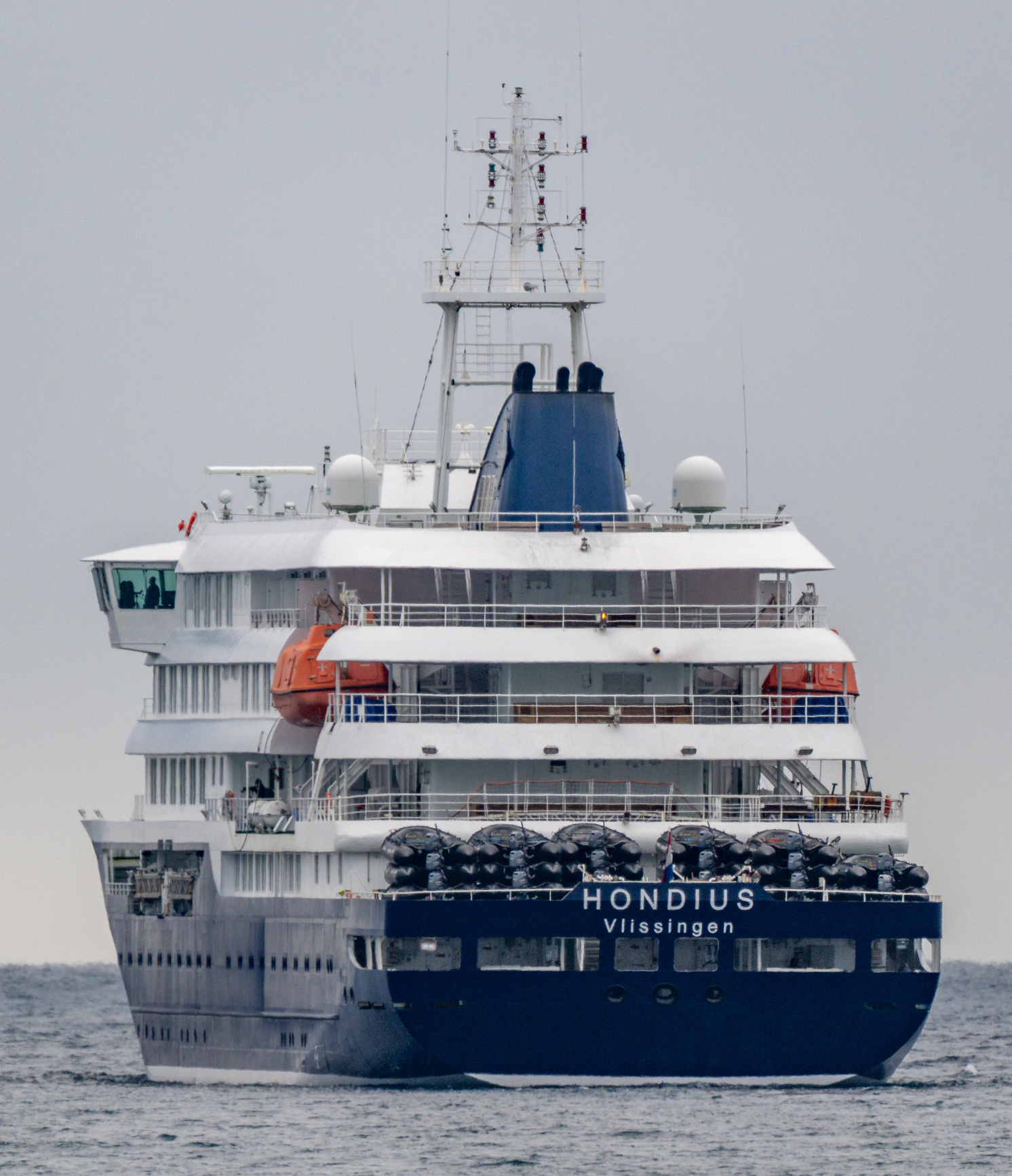
Stern

Hondius is 107.6 metres (353 ft 0 in) long overall and 94.275 metres (309 ft 3.6 in) between perpendiculars, has a beam of 17.6 metres (57 ft 9 in), and draws 5.36 metres (17 ft 7 in) of water with a displacement of 5,633 tonnes (5,544 long tons). Her gross tonnage is 6,603; net tonnage 2,057; and deadweight tonnage 1,154 tonnes. Her hull and propulsion system are strengthened for navigation in ice-covered waters according to Polar Class 6, which is intended for summer and autumn operation in medium first-year ice, which may include old ice inclusions.

Unlike bigger and more luxurious cruise ships, Hondius is built to support expedition-style voyages and activity-based shore excursions in polar regions. The ship can accommodate up to 170 passengers in 80 outside passenger cabins across eight categories from four-berth staterooms to grand suites with private balcony. The public spaces include a dining room, a lecture room, and an observation lounge, as well as two gangways and an indoor platform to embark Zodiac inflatable boats. The ship has a crew of 57 with an additional 13 guides and a doctor.

The ship's propulsion system consists of two 2,130-kilowatt (2,860 hp) 12-cylinder Anglo Belgian Corporation (ABC) 12DZC four-stroke medium-speed diesel engines geared to a single controllable pitch propeller. This gives Hondius a service speed of 15 knots (28 km/h; 17 mph). Onboard electricity can be generated either with a shaft generator driven by power take-off from the ship's main propulsion or two 750-kilowatt (1,010 hp) auxiliary diesel generators. For maneuvering in ports as well as maintaining station without dropping an anchor to seafloor during shore excursions, Hondius has two transverse thrusters: one in the bow and another in the stern.

== History ==
=== 2016–2019: Order, construction, delivery ===
In late 2016, Oceanwide Expeditions ordered an ice-strengthened expedition vessel from Brodosplit in Split, Croatia. The ship, named Hondius after the Flemish cartographer Jodocus Hondius, would be the first newly built ship for the company that had previously operated chartered or converted second-hand tonnage.

First steel was cut on 22 August 2017, followed by keel laying on 11 December 2017 and launching on 10 June 2018. The completed vessel was delivered on 22 May 2019 and on the same day Oceanwide Expeditions signed a new contract with the shipyard for the construction of a sister ship, Janssonius.

=== 2019–2026: Expedition cruises ===
In June 2019, Hondius was off on her first excursion to Spitsbergen.

In December 2019, Hondius participated in the search for the Chilean Air Force C-130 airplane '990' following her disappearance. She was the closest ship in the area, being 11 nautical miles (13 mi; 20 km) away from where the airplane disappeared from the radar.

In March 2026, Oceanwide Expeditions signed a Letter of Intent for the construction and delivery of two new Hondius-class vessels. These eco-sail vessels are an iteration of the Hondius design, featuring additional sustainability-focused features including a hybrid sail propulsion system. The first is planned for launch in 2029, with the second planned in 2030.

=== 2026: Hantavirus outbreak ===
In April 2026, an outbreak of hantavirus on board Hondius killed three people and left another seriously ill. Thereafter, the ship was placed under isolation. She was anchored off the coast of the Cape Verde Islands in early May 2026, with passengers unable to disembark. Hondius arrived at Tenerife, Canary Islands, on 10 May. Her passengers were flown home. Hondius arrived at Rotterdam on 18 May. The 27 people on board were quarantined and the ship was disinfected.
