= Sangassou virus =

Orthohantavirus sangassouense

Virus classification
- (unranked): Virus
- Realm: Riboviria
- Kingdom: Orthornavirae
- Phylum: Negarnaviricota
- Class: Bunyaviricetes
- Order: Elliovirales
- Family: Hantaviridae
- Genus: Orthohantavirus
- Species: Orthohantavirus sangassouense

Synonyms
- Sangassou hantavirus; Sangassou orthohantavirus; Sangassou virus

Species of virus

Sangassou virus (SANGV) is single-stranded, negative-sense RNA virus species of the genus Orthohantavirus in the Bunyavirales order. It was first isolated in an African wood mouse (Hylomyscus simus) in the forest in Guinea, West Africa in 2010. It is named for the village near where the mouse was trapped. It is the first indigenous Murinae-associated African hantavirus to be discovered.

== Genome ==
The virus genome consists of three segments of negative-stranded RNA; the large (L) segment encodes the viral RNA-dependent RNA polymerase, the medium (M) segment encodes the envelope glycoproteins Gn and Gc (cotranslationally cleaved from a glycoprotein precursor), and the small (S) segment encodes the nucleocapsid (N) protein.

== Renal syndrome ==
In rodents, hantavirus produces a chronic infection with no adverse sequelae. In humans, hantavirus produces two major clinical syndromes: hemorrhagic fever or pulmonary syndrome. European, Asian, and African rodent-borne hantaviruses cause hemorrhagic fever. The pulmonary syndrome is caused mainly by Sin Nombre virus and Andes virus in the Americas.

== Reservoirs ==
Natural reservoirs for this hantavirus species include the slit faced bat, moles, and shrews. Rodent-borne hantaviruses form three major evolutionary clades corresponding to the subfamilies of their rodent hosts. Hantaan virus, Seoul virus, and Dobrava-Belgrade virus are examples of Murinae-associated hantaviruses. Puumala virus and Tula virus belong to the Arvicolinae-associated hantaviruses, and Sin Nombre virus and Andes virus are representatives of Neotominae- and Sigmodontinae-associated hantaviruses.

== See also ==
- Murinae
