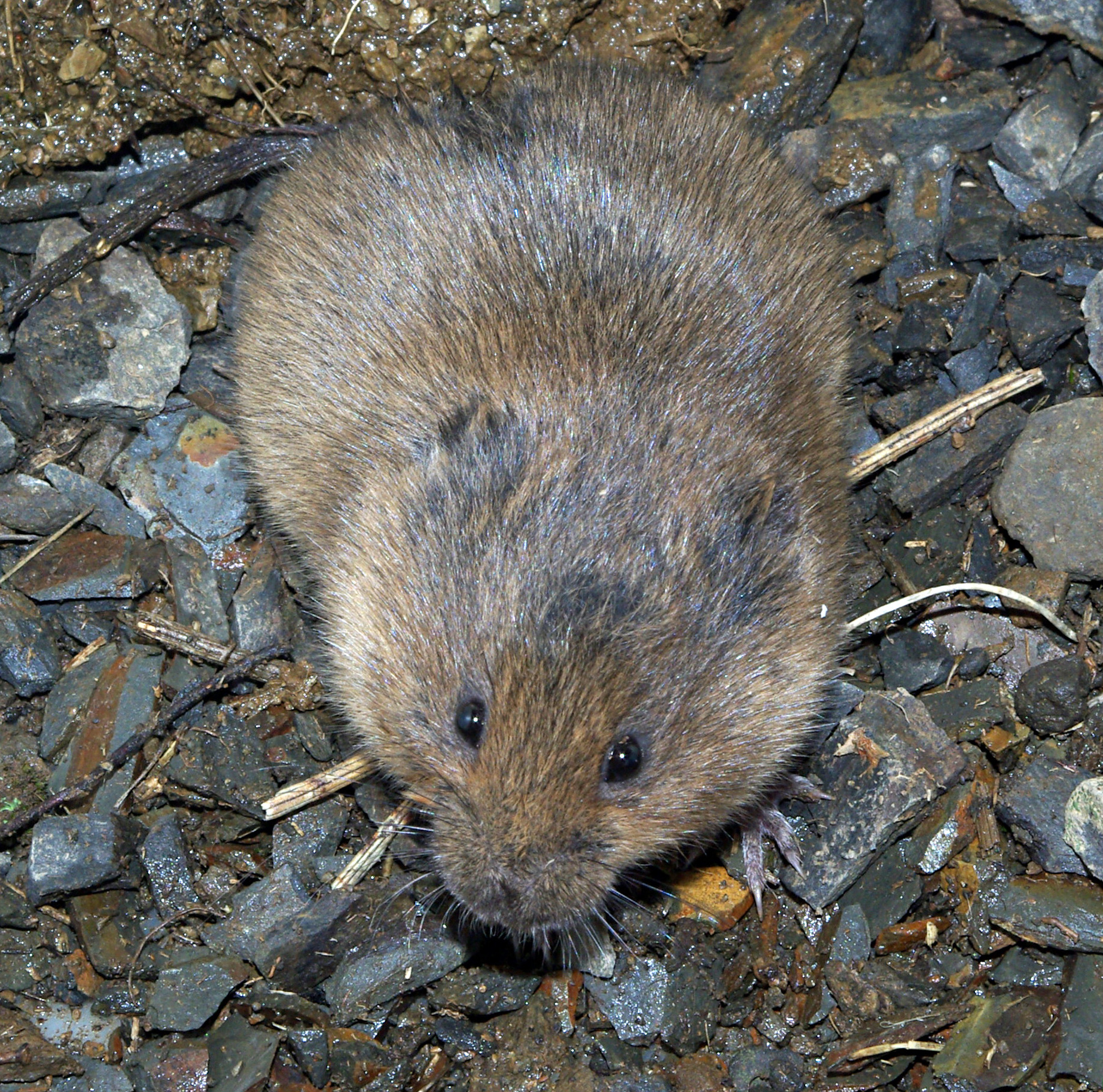
- Microtus agrestis, the natural reservoir of Orthohantavirus tatenalense

Virus classification
- (unranked): Virus
- Realm: Riboviria
- Kingdom: Orthornavirae
- Phylum: Negarnaviricota
- Class: Bunyaviricetes
- Order: Elliovirales
- Family: Hantaviridae
- Genus: Orthohantavirus
- Species: Orthohantavirus tatenalense

= Tatenale virus =

Orthohantavirus tatenalense

Species of hantavirus

Tatenale virus (TATV), formally Orthohantavirus tatenalense, is a species of hantavirus first identified in 2013 in a field vole near Tattenhall, Cheshire, in northwest England. Its name derives from Tattenhall's medieval Latin name. It is one of two hantaviruses known to circulate in the United Kingdom, the other being Seoul virus carried by brown rats.

== Virology ==
The Tatenale virus has a negative-sense single-stranded RNA genome as with other orthohantaviruses. Phylogenetic analyses shows partial affinity with other vole-related hantaviruses, namely Prospect Hill virus and Tula virus.

=== Strains ===
Recovery of coding sequences in 2020 confirmed that Tatenale virus and the "Traemersee virus" found in Germany in 2019 are members of the same viral species, with evolutionary distance values below the speciation threshold of 0.1; the species name Tatenale orthohantavirus was proposed on this basis, given the earlier detection and greater establishment in the literature of the Tatenale designation. The "Rusne virus" a hantavirus strain found in 2021 in a Lithuanian vole was later classified by the ICTV as being a Tatenale strain, while also stating that the name "Rusne virus" should no longer be used.

== Natural reservoir ==
The reservoir of Tatenale virus is the field vole. A survey of field voles in Kielder Forest, Northumberland, recorded a prevalence of approximately 17%, or 8 out of 48 animals. It has not been found in other rodents in England.

== Zoonosis ==
No zoonotic potential has been confirmed for Tatenale virus. However, blood from the originally infected vole showed cross-reactivity with Puumala virus antigen, which is another vole-related hantavirus. Potentially, some serologically diagnosed cases of hemorrhagic fever with renal syndrome attributed to Puumala virus in England could actually be Tatenale infections, mayhaps.

== See also ==
- Seoul virus
- Puumala virus
