= Bowé virus =

Orthohantavirus boweense

Virus classification
- (unranked): Virus
- Realm: Riboviria
- Kingdom: Orthornavirae
- Phylum: Negarnaviricota
- Class: Bunyaviricetes
- Order: Elliovirales
- Family: Hantaviridae
- Genus: Orthohantavirus
- Species: Orthohantavirus boweense

Synonyms
- Bowe orthohantavirus; Bowé virus

Species of virus

Bowé virus (BOWV) is a viral isolate detected in tissue samples from Crocidura douceti (musk shrew). The putative host shrews were captured in Bowé, Guinea, in February 2012. BOWV is closely related to Tanganya virus, harbored by Crocidura theresae in the same region, as well as the Jeju virus.
