= Rockport virus =

Orthohantavirus rockportense

Virus classification
- (unranked): Virus
- Realm: Riboviria
- Kingdom: Orthornavirae
- Phylum: Negarnaviricota
- Class: Bunyaviricetes
- Order: Elliovirales
- Family: Hantaviridae
- Genus: Orthohantavirus
- Species: Orthohantavirus rockportense

Synonyms
- Rockport orthohantavirus; Rockport virus

Species of virus

Rockport virus (RKPV) is a single-stranded, enveloped, negative-sense RNA orthohantavirus.

== Natural reservoir ==
Rockport virus was first isolated in archival tissues of four Eastern moles found in and around Rockport, Texas.

== Virology ==
Phylogenetic analysis shows Rockport virus clusters geographically with Andes virus (ANDV) and Sin Nombre virus (SNV), both of which are carried by sigmodontine and Neotominae rodents. It shares the same S and the L genomic-segment with Puumala virus (PUUV), Tula virus (TULV), and Prospect Hill virus (PHV).

== See also ==
- Hantavirus pulmonary syndrome
- 1993 Four Corners hantavirus outbreak
- Cross-species transmission
- Hantavirus hemorrhagic fever with renal syndrome
