= Cao Bằng virus =

Orthohantavirus caobangense

Virus classification
- (unranked): Virus
- Realm: Riboviria
- Kingdom: Orthornavirae
- Phylum: Negarnaviricota
- Class: Bunyaviricetes
- Order: Elliovirales
- Family: Hantaviridae
- Genus: Orthohantavirus
- Species: Orthohantavirus caobangense

Synonyms
- Cao Bằng orthohantavirus; Cao Bằng virus

Species of virus

Cao Bằng virus (CBNV) is a virus of the Orthohantavirus genus detected in tissue samples of the Anourosorex squamipes (Chinese mole shrew) and the Anourosorex yamashinai (Taiwanese mole shrew). It is named for the Cao Bằng region in northern Vietnam, where it was originally discovered in 2006. Unlike the more well-known rodent-borne hantaviruses that cause severe human diseases like the Andes virus, CBNV is primarily associated with shrews and are used to study hantavirus evolution.

== Discovery ==
The virus was first discovered in the lung tissues of the Chinese mole shrew (Anourosorex squamipes) in the Cao Bằng, which challenged the long-held belief that hantaviruses were almost exclusively hosted by rodents. In 2016, a variant was found in Taiwanese mole shrews (Anourosorex yamashinai) in Taiwan. A different genotype was also found in Chinese mole shrews in the Yunnan Province of China. The respective Xinyi virus (XYIV) and Lianghe virus (LHEV) were found to be derived from CBNV and share a common ancestry.

== Characteristics ==
Like other members of the Orthohantavirus genus, CBNV is an enveloped virus with a tri-segmented, negative-sense RNA genome consisting of L, M, and S segments. The Large (L) segment encodes the RNA-dependent RNA polymerase (RdRp), the Medium (M) segment encodes the glycoprotein precursor (GPC), and the Small (S) segment encodes the nucleocapsid protein N. Genetic analysis of the S, M, and L segments indicates that all three viruses parallel the evolutionary relationships of their shrew hosts.

== Infection ==
To date, there are no recorded cases of CBNV infection in humans. Current research suggests that CBNV is considered a "shrew-borne" virus and has not yet been linked to human illness.

However, following the hantavirus outbreak on a Dutch-flagged ship in 2026, the Vietnamese government released a statement outlining the current situation. While there have been no recorded cases in Vietnam to date, the Ministry of Health advised several proactive physical pest control measures to its citizens.

== See also ==
- Orthohantavirus
- Hantaan virus and Seoul virus – other viral isolates found in East Asia
