= Serang virus =

Virus classification
- (unranked): Virus
- Realm: Riboviria
- Kingdom: Orthornavirae
- Phylum: Negarnaviricota
- Class: Bunyaviricetes
- Order: Elliovirales
- Family: Hantaviridae
- Genus: Orthohantavirus
- Species: incertae sedis
- Virus: Serang virus

Species of virus

Serang virus (SERV) is a single-stranded, negative-sense, enveloped, novel RNA orthohantavirus.

== Natural reservoir ==
SERV was first isolated from the Asian house rat (R.Tanezumi) in Serang, Indonesia in 2000.

== Virology ==
Phylogenetic analysis based on partial L, M and S segment nucleotide sequences show SERV is novel and distinct among the hantaviruses. It is most closely related to Thailand virus (THAIV) which is carried by the great bandicoot rat (Bandicota indica). Nucleotide sequence comparison suggests that SERV is the result of cross-species transmission from bandicoots to Asian rats.

== See also ==
- Hantavirus hemorrhagic fever with renal syndrome
- Seoul virus
