= Calabazo virus =

Virus classification
- (unranked): Virus
- Realm: Riboviria
- Kingdom: Orthornavirae
- Phylum: Negarnaviricota
- Class: Bunyaviricetes
- Order: Elliovirales
- Family: Hantaviridae
- Genus: Orthohantavirus
- Species: incertae sedis
- Virus: Calabazo virus

Species of virus

Calabazo virus is an enveloped, single-stranded, negative-sense RNA hantavirus species of the order Bunyavirales. It is a novel New World microtine rodent-borne hantavirus discovered in Central America on the Azuero Peninsula of Panama in early 2000. Human infection with Calabazo virus results in respiratory illness similar to Hantavirus pulmonary syndrome but it is not severe or fatal and rarely requires hospitalization.

== Reservoir ==
Calabazo virus was identified in the cane mouse (Zygodontomys brevicauda).

== Transmission ==
Calabazo virus has not been shown to transfer from person-to-person. Transmission by aerosolized rodent excreta still remains the only known way the hantaviruses are transmitted to humans. In general, droplet and/or fomite transfer has not been shown in these viruses in either the hemorrhagic or pulmonary forms.

== See also ==
- Choclo virus
- Hantavirus pulmonary syndrome
- 1993 Four Corners hantavirus outbreak
