= Topografov virus =

Virus classification
- (unranked): Virus
- Realm: Riboviria
- Kingdom: Orthornavirae
- Phylum: Negarnaviricota
- Class: Bunyaviricetes
- Order: Elliovirales
- Family: Hantaviridae
- Genus: Orthohantavirus
- Species: Khabarovsk orthohantavirus
- Virus: Topografov virus

Species of virus

Topografov virus is an enveloped, negative-sense RNA virus of the genus Orthohantavirus in the Bunyavirales order. It is the first hantavirus to be isolated from Siberian lemmings (Lemmus sibiricus) found near the Topografov River in the Taymyr Peninsula, Siberia.

== Virology ==
Hantaviruses have been shown to evolve with their hosts. Phylogenetic analysis demonstrates that Topografov virus is related to Khabarovsk virus and Puumala virus. This close relationship is believed to be due to a rodent host switch that took place at some point their respective evolutions. Topografov virus and Khabarovsk virus are believed to have a common ancestor, possibly from a Microtus species that lived over 1 million years ago.

This host switch has been known to occur only once before in white-footed mice (Peromyscus leucopus) in North America.

== See also ==
- Hantavirus hemorrhagic fever with renal syndrome
- Imjin virus
