= Khabarovsk virus =

Virus classification
- (unranked): Virus
- Realm: Riboviria
- Kingdom: Orthornavirae
- Phylum: Negarnaviricota
- Class: Bunyaviricetes
- Order: Elliovirales
- Family: Hantaviridae
- Genus: Orthohantavirus
- Species: Orthohantavirus khabarovskense
- Virus: Khabarovsk virus

Synonyms
- Khabarovsk hantavirus; Khabarovsk orthohantavirus

Species of virus

Khabarovsk virus (KBR) is a orthohantavirus in the Bunyavirales order isolated from Microtus fortis discovered in far-east Russia. It is an enveloped, negative-sense RNA virus.

== Virology ==
Two strains of KBR were isolated in Microtus fortis trapped in the Khabarovsk region of far-eastern Russia. The nucleotide sequences revealed that the two isolates were closely related to each other but distinct from all other hantaviruses. Phylogenetic analysis showed that these strains form a separate branch in the Hantavirus tree, positioned between the branches of Prospect Hill and Puumala viruses. Puumala virus was the closest relative, both genetically and serologically.

== See also ==
- RNA virus
- Puumala virus
- Topografov virus
