= Black Creek Canal virus =

Orthohantavirus nigrorivense

Virus classification
- (unranked): Virus
- Realm: Riboviria
- Kingdom: Orthornavirae
- Phylum: Negarnaviricota
- Class: Bunyaviricetes
- Order: Elliovirales
- Family: Hantaviridae
- Genus: Orthohantavirus
- Species: Orthohantavirus nigrorivense

Synonyms
- Black Creek Canal hantavirus; Black Creek Canal orthohantavirus; Black Creek Canal virus

Species of virus

Black Creek Canal virus (BCCV) is a single-stranded, negative sense RNA virus species of New World Orthohantavirus. It was first isolated in cotton rats (Sigmodon hispidus) found in the Black Creek Canal area of Dade County, Florida, in 1995. The discovery followed from an isolated case of Hantavirus pulmonary syndrome diagnosed in a Dade County resident.

== Natural reservoir ==
While several species are responsible for Hantavirus hemorrhagic fever syndrome (HFS) and Hantavirus pulmonary syndrome (HPS), each species of hantavirus is unique to a single reservoir. This makes host evolution and geography important factors in understanding transmission and prevention of spread of disease to humans.

== Transmission ==
BCCV, like other species of hantavirus, is transmitted via droplet respiration when rodent excreta becomes aerosolized. The greater the concentration of rodent excreta, as occurs in seasonal use structures such as sheds, vacation cabins, and camp grounds, the greater the likelihood of transmission and infection.

The Dade County patient is thought to have contracted the previously undocumented BCCV in the seven weeks prior to his hospitalization. The 33-year-old man resided in a semirural area of southern Dade County. The residence was surrounded by grassy fields observed to have active rodent populations of several species. The patient reported observing rodents in both his home and the fields immediately surrounding the residence.

== Case Study Dade County ==
A patient was hospitalized in October 1993 with sepsis, acute kidney injury, acute rhabdomyolysis, and suspected disseminated intravascular coagulation: an overactivity of clotting proteins that can lead to eventual hemorrhage as the proteins are degraded. Self-reported history of illness included a four-day prodrome of fever, malaise, vomiting, muscle aches, chills, and abdominal pain. By the third day of illness, the patient's fever had reached 102 °F (39 °C), blood pressure acutely narrow and hypotensive (74/50 mmHg), elevated breathing rate (24 breaths/min), and exhibited abnormal hematological and chemical profiles. Patient went on to develop acute kidney failure along with pulmonary edema, alveolar edema with small pleural effusions, and resulting severe hypoxia. He was treated with broad-spectrum antibiotics as well as supplemental fluids and oxygen. Patient was intubated for a 12-day period and given vasopressor treatment for three days following continued and severe hypotension. Twelve days after admission patient showed extreme improvement in airway management. Peripheral edema spontaneously diuresed. Patient removed from ventilation and discharged 5 days post-extubation in good condition.

== See also ==
- Sin Nombre virus
- 1993 Four Corners hantavirus outbreak
