= Rio Segundo virus =

Virus classification
- (unranked): Virus
- Realm: Riboviria
- Kingdom: Orthornavirae
- Phylum: Negarnaviricota
- Class: Bunyaviricetes
- Order: Elliovirales
- Family: Hantaviridae
- Genus: Orthohantavirus
- Virus: Rio Segundo virus

Species of virus

Rio Segundo virus is a single-stranded, negative-sense RNA orthohantavirus isolated in the Costa Rican harvest mouse (Reithrodontomys mexicanus). It is phylogenetically related to Sin Nombre virus and causes hantavirus pulmonary syndrome. No cases in humans have yet been reported but it is believed this is due to misdiagnosis and confusion with other rapidly progressive, life-threatening respiratory illnesses such as plague, influenza and pneumococcal pneumonia. In addition, human contact with infected mice in Mexico may be less frequent than human contact in the western United States.

== See also ==
- Hantavirus pulmonary syndrome
- Hantavirus hemorrhagic fever with renal syndrome
- 1993 Four Corners hantavirus outbreak
