= Gou virus =

Virus classification
- (unranked): Virus
- Realm: Riboviria
- Kingdom: Orthornavirae
- Phylum: Negarnaviricota
- Class: Bunyaviricetes
- Order: Elliovirales
- Family: Hantaviridae
- Genus: Orthohantavirus
- Species: Seoul orthohantavirus
- Virus: Gou virus

Species of virus

Gou virus (GOUV) is a single-stranded, negative-sense, enveloped novel RNA orthohantavirus. It is one of the known hantaviruses responsible for hantavirus hemorrhagic fever with renal syndrome in humans.

== Natural reservoir ==
Gou virus was first isolated from black rats (R. rattus) captured in Zhejiang Province in 2000. Genetically variant strains of GOUV have been found in black rats in Longquan, China. In addition, hantavirus strains isolated from R. flavipectus and R. norvegicus in Longquan are most closely related to GOUV.

== Transmission ==
Like all hantaviruses, transmission to humans is primarily through aerosolized rodent excreta and hand-to-mouth contamination from fomites. No human-to-human transmission has been documented. Longquan City, Zhejiang province, China, has a persistently high rate of human infection with GOUV. There is speculation that a variant strain of GOUV is transmissible from human-to-human. However, this has not yet been confirmed with epidemiological trace-back analysis.

== Morbidity and mortality ==
Between 1974–2011, in annual numbers (cases/100,000 population), a total of 20 patients died of HFRS in Longquan, with an average fatality rate of 1.07%. The highest fatalities were between 1974–1983 with an 11% death rate (10 deaths/91 cases). Seasonally, all deaths occurred in autumn and winter. No deaths have been reported since 2007. This is believed to be due to early diagnosis and improved supportive treatment.

== See also ==
- Cross-species transmission
- Novel virus
