= Azagny virus =

Virus classification
- (unranked): Virus
- Realm: Riboviria
- Kingdom: Orthornavirae
- Phylum: Negarnaviricota
- Class: Bunyaviricetes
- Order: Elliovirales
- Family: Hantaviridae
- Genus: Orthohantavirus
- Species: incertae sedis
- Virus: Azagny virus

Species of virus

Azagny virus (AZGV) is an Orthohantavirus found in West African pygmy shrews. The virus was named after the Azagny National Park, where some sample collecting occurred.
