= Asama virus =

Orthohantavirus asamaense

Virus classification
- (unranked): Virus
- Realm: Riboviria
- Kingdom: Orthornavirae
- Phylum: Negarnaviricota
- Class: Bunyaviricetes
- Order: Elliovirales
- Family: Hantaviridae
- Genus: Orthohantavirus
- Species: Orthohantavirus asamaense

Synonyms
- Asama virus; Asama orthohantavirus

Species of virus

Asama virus (ASAV) is a single-stranded, enveloped, segmented negative-sense RNA hantavirus. The hantavirus was isolated in Japan from Japanese shrew mole. Hantaviruses harbored by shrews are genetically closer to ASAV than to hantaviruses harbored by rodents. Host-switching may be evident in the future due to the viruses closeness to soricine shrew-borne hantaviruses. The detection of the ASAV was the first hantavirus found to be hosted by members of the family Talpidae, which includes shrew moles. Thoughts on hantavirus evolutionary history has expanded due to the discovery of ASAV.

== Natural reservoir ==
Asama virus was isolated through RNA extracts from lung tissues of the Japanese shrew mole (Urotrichus talpoides), captured in Japan between February and April 2008. It is one of the first hantaviruses found in a mole.

== Virology ==
Asama virus is genetically closer to other hantaviruses harbored by shrews than by rodents. However, the nucleocapsid protein is similar to that of rodent and shrew-borne hantaviruses. Phylogenetic analyses positions it closest to soricine shrew-borne hantaviruses. This suggests a possible host-switching event in the distant past.

Asama virus is related to soricine shrew-borne hantaviruses that are found in North America, Europe, and Asia. This relation was discovered through phylogenetic analyses. The relationship between the two hantaviruses may suggest parallel evolution associated with cross-species transmission.

== See also ==
- Hantavirus hemorrhagic fever with renal syndrome
