= Asikkala virus =

Orthohantavirus asikkalaense

Virus classification
- (unranked): Virus
- Realm: Riboviria
- Kingdom: Orthornavirae
- Phylum: Negarnaviricota
- Class: Bunyaviricetes
- Order: Elliovirales
- Family: Hantaviridae
- Genus: Orthohantavirus
- Species: Orthohantavirus asikkalaense

Synonyms
- Asikkala virus; Asikkala orthohantavirus

Species of virus

Asikkala virus (ASIV) is an Old World hantavirus isolated from Sorex araneus (pygmy shrew) in Germany and the Czech Republic. It is suspected to have a geographical distribution mapping with Seewis virus.
