= Tanganya virus =

Virus classification
- (unranked): Virus
- Realm: Riboviria
- Kingdom: Orthornavirae
- Phylum: Negarnaviricota
- Class: Bunyaviricetes
- Order: Elliovirales
- Family: Hantaviridae
- Genus: Orthohantavirus (?)
- Species: incertae sedis
- Virus: Tanganya virus

Species of virus

Tanganya virus (TGNV) is an enveloped, single-stranded, negative-sense RNA virus, possibly of the genus Orthohantavirus. It is the second indigenous Murinae-associated African hantavirus to be discovered. It has a low sequence similarity to other hantaviruses and is serologically distinct from other hantaviruses. It was discovered in January 2004 after extraction from tissue samples taken from a Therese's shrew (Crocidura theresae) near the village of Tanganya, Guinea.
