= El Moro Canyon virus =

Virus classification
- (unranked): Virus
- Realm: Riboviria
- Kingdom: Orthornavirae
- Phylum: Negarnaviricota
- Class: Bunyaviricetes
- Order: Elliovirales
- Family: Hantaviridae
- Genus: Orthohantavirus
- Species: Orthohantavirus carrizalense
- Virus: El Moro Canyon virus

Strains
- Carrizal virus; El Moro Canyon virus; Huitzilac virus

Synonyms
- El Moro Canyon hantavirus; El Moro Canyon orthohantavirus

Species of virus

El Moro Canyon virus is a single-stranded, negative sense RNA virus of the genus Orthohantavirus. It is a causative agent of Hantavirus pulmonary syndrome.

== Natural reservoir ==
El Moro Canyon virus was isolated from western harvest mice (Reithrodontomys megalotis), in El Moro Canyon in southeastern Colorado in 1995.

Carrizal virus and Huitzilac virus, two additional strains, were first identified in Mexican wild rodents located in Morelos and Guerrero, Mexico.
