= Caño Delgadito virus =

Orthohantavirus delgaditoense

Virus classification
- (unranked): Virus
- Realm: Riboviria
- Kingdom: Orthornavirae
- Phylum: Negarnaviricota
- Class: Bunyaviricetes
- Order: Elliovirales
- Family: Hantaviridae
- Genus: Orthohantavirus
- Species: Orthohantavirus delgaditoense

Synonyms
- Cano Delgadito hantavirus; Caño Delgadito hantavirus; Cano Delgadito orthohantavirus; Caño Delgadito orthohantavirus; Cano Delgadito virus; Caño Delgadito virus

Species of virus

Caño Delgadito virus (CADV) is a hantavirus present in Venezuela. Its natural reservoir is Alston's cotton rat. Transmission among cotton rats appears to be horizontal. While human disease caused by CADV has not yet been identified, it has been isolated from oropharyngeal swabs and urine of infected cotton rats, indicating that it may be infectious to humans in the same manner as other hantaviruses, via inhalation of aerosolized droplets of saliva, respiratory secretions, or urine. CADV was discovered in the 1990s from rodent species in the Llanos in Venezuela.
