= Laguna Negra virus =

Virus classification
- (unranked): Virus
- Realm: Riboviria
- Kingdom: Orthornavirae
- Phylum: Negarnaviricota
- Class: Bunyaviricetes
- Order: Elliovirales
- Family: Hantaviridae
- Genus: Orthohantavirus
- Species: Orthohantavirus mamorense
- Virus: Laguna Negra virus

Synonyms
- Laguna Negra hantavirus; Laguna Negra orthohantavirus

Species of virus

Laguna Negra virus (LANV) is a virus in the genus Orthohantavirus.
