= Oxbow virus =

Virus classification
- (unranked): Virus
- Realm: Riboviria
- Kingdom: Orthornavirae
- Phylum: Negarnaviricota
- Class: Bunyaviricetes
- Order: Elliovirales
- Family: Hantaviridae
- Genus: Orthohantavirus
- Species: incertae sedis
- Virus: Oxbow virus

Species of virus

Oxbow virus (OXBV) is a single-stranded, enveloped, negative-sense RNA orthohantavirus.

== Natural reservoir ==
Oxbow virus was isolated from an American shrew mole (Neurotrichus gibbsii), captured in Gresham, Oregon, in September 2003.

== Virology ==
The genome of the Oxbow virus along the full length of the S, M, and partial L-segment nucleotide and amino acid sequences show a low sequence similarity to rodent-borne hantaviruses. Phylogenetic analysis demonstrated that Oxbow virus and Asama virus are related to soricine shrew-borne hantaviruses found in North America, Europe, and Asia. This suggests both these viruses evolved with cross-species transmission.

== See also ==
- Hantavirus pulmonary syndrome
- Hantavirus hemorrhagic fever with renal syndrome
- Cross-species transmission
