= Isla Vista virus =

Virus classification
- (unranked): Virus
- Realm: Riboviria
- Kingdom: Orthornavirae
- Phylum: Negarnaviricota
- Class: Bunyaviricetes
- Order: Elliovirales
- Family: Hantaviridae
- Genus: Orthohantavirus
- Virus: Isla Vista virus

Unclassified hantavirus

Isla Vista virus (ILV) is an enveloped, single-stranded, negative-sense RNA hantavirus. It is a novel New World microtine rodent hantavirus discovered in the California vole (M. californicus) in Santa Barbara County, California, near Isla Vista. It is similar to Prospect Hill virus, which has been isolated from a meadow vole (Microtus pennsylvanicus).

== See also ==
- Arvicolinae
- New World rats and mice
