= Dobrava-Belgrade virus =

Orthohantavirus dobravaense

Virus classification
- (unranked): Virus
- Realm: Riboviria
- Kingdom: Orthornavirae
- Phylum: Negarnaviricota
- Class: Bunyaviricetes
- Order: Elliovirales
- Family: Hantaviridae
- Genus: Orthohantavirus
- Species: Orthohantavirus dobravaense

Synonyms
- Dobrava-Belgrade hantavirus; Dobrava-Belgrade orthohantavirus; Dobrava-Belgrade virus

Disease of Mice

Dobrava-Belgrade virus (DOBV) is the main cause of hemorrhagic fever with renal syndrome (HFRS) in southern Europe. In its natural reservoirs, DOBV causes a persistent, asymptomatic infection and is spread through excretions, fighting, and grooming. Humans can become infected by inhaling aerosols that contain rodent saliva, urine, or feces, as well as through bites and scratches. In humans, infection causes fever and headache, as well as the appearance of spots on the skin and renal symptoms such as kidney swelling, excess protein in urine, blood in urine, decreased urine production, and kidney failure. Acute respiratory distress syndrome occurs in about 10% of cases.

DOBV has four genotypes: Dobrava virus, Sochi virus, Kurkino virus, and Saaremaa virus. These genotypes are native to different rodent species and vary in how severe of illness they cause. Dobrava virus is carried by the yellow-necked mouse (Apodemus flavicollis) and has moderate-to-severe symptoms with a case fatality rate of 10–12%. Sochi virus is native to the Black Sea field mouse (Apodemus ponticus) and has moderate-to-severe symptoms and a case fatality rate of at least 6%. Kurkino virus is transmitted by the striped field mouse (Apodemus agrarius) and has mild-to-moderate symptoms with a 0.3–0.9% case fatality rate. Lastly, Saaremaa virus, also transmitted by the striped field mouse, is not associated with disease or mortality.

The genome of DOBV is about 11.8 kilobases (kb) in length and segmented into three negative-sense, single-stranded RNA (-ssRNA) strands. The small strand encodes the viral nucleoprotein, the medium strand encodes the viral spike protein, which attaches to cell receptors for entry into cells, and the long strand encodes the viral RNA-dependent RNA polymerase (RdRp), which replicates and transcribes the genome. Genome segments are encased in nucleoproteins to form ribonucleoprotein (RNP) complexes that are surrounded by a viral envelope that contains spikes emanating from its surface.

Dobrava-Belgrade virus replicates first by binding to the surface of cells with its envelope spikes. Virus particles, called virions, are then taken into the cell by endosomes, where a drop in pH causes the viral envelope to fuse with the endosome, which releases viral RNA into the host cell. RdRp then transcribes the genome for translation by host cell ribosomes and produces copies of the genome for progeny viruses. New virions are assembled at the endoplasmic reticulum and bud from its surface to obtain their viral envelope. Progeny viruses are then transported by a cellular vesicle to the cell membrane, where they leave the cell by exocytosis.

Dobrava-Belgrade virus was first discovered in 1992 after being isolated from the lung tissue of a yellow-necked mouse in Dobrava, Slovenia. At the same time, an identical virus was identified in Belgrade, Serbia, earning the virus the name "Dobrava-Belgrade virus". Within a few years, the virus had been identified throughout Europe and Russia. The virus was implicated in an outbreak of HFRS in Croatia during the Balkan Wars. The main region affected by DOBV is southeastern Europe, but its distribution has been expanding since its hosts extend outside the region.

== Genome ==
The genome of Dobrava-Belgrade virus is about 11.8 thousand nucleotides in length and segmented into three negative-sense, single-stranded RNA (-ssRNA) strands. The segments form into circles via non-covalent bonding of the ends of the genome. The small segment, about 1.67 kilobases (kb) in length, encodes the viral nucleoprotein. The medium segment, about 3.64 kb in length. encodes a glycoprotein precursor that is cleaved into the two spike proteins Gn and Gc during virion assembly. The large segment, about 6.53 kb in length, encodes the viral RNA-dependent RNA polymerase (RdRp), which is responsible for transcribing and replicating the genome. The ends of each segment contain untranslated terminal regions (UTRs) that are involved in the replication and transcription of the genome.

== Structure ==
Virions are mostly spherical or pleomorphic in shape and range from 80 to 160 nm in diameter. They contain a lipid envelope covered in spike proteins made of the two viral glycoproteins, Gn and Gc. The spike proteins extend about 10 nm out from the surface and are tetrameric, consisting of four copies each of Gn and Gc with helical symmetry, in which Gn forms the stalk of the spike and Gc the head. Spikes are arranged on the surface in a lattice pattern. Inside the envelope are the three genome segments, which are encased in nucleoproteins to form a ribonucleoprotein (RNP) complex. Attached to each RNP complex is a copy of RdRp.

== Life cycle ==
DOBV primarily infects endothelial cells and macrophages. It enters cells by using β3-integrins as receptors. Virions are taken into a cell via an endosome. Once pH is lowered, the viral envelope fuses with the endosome, which releases viral RNA into the host cell's cytoplasm. The small segment is transcribed by RdRp first, then the medium segment, and lastly the large segment. Once the genome has been transcribed, RdRp snatches caps from host messenger RNA (mRNA) to create viral mRNA that is primed for translation by host ribosomes to produce viral proteins.

For replication of the genome, a complementary positive-sense strand is produced by RdRp. Copies of the genome are made from this complementary strand. Progeny RNA strands are then encapsidated by nucleoproteins. During replication, the glycoprotein is cleaved in the endoplasmic reticulum by the host signal peptidase during translation. This produces Gn at the N-terminus and Gc at the C-terminus of the protein. Spike proteins are expressed on the surface of the endoplasmic reticulum. Viral RNPs are transported to the endoplasmic reticulum where they bud from the surface, thereby obtaining their envelope. Progeny viruses are then transported by a cellular vesicle to the cell membrane, where they leave the cell via exocytosis.

== Diversity ==
There are four genotypes of DOBV: Dobrava, Kurkino, Saaremaa, and Sochi. The Dobrava genotype causes infection mainly in southeastern Europe in Slovenia, Serbia, Montenegro, Albania, Greece, but also in central Europe in Czechia, Slovakia, and Hungary. The Kurkino genotype exists in Germany, Slovakia, Russia, Hungary, Slovenia, Croatia, and mainland Estonia. The Saaremaa genotype is found on Saaremaa island in Estonia. The Sochi genotype is found in the Black Sea region of eastern Russia.

== Evolution ==
The most common way that hantaviruses evolve is through mutations of individual nucleotides being inserted, deleted, or substituted. Because Dobrava-Belgrade virus has a segmented genome, it is possible for recombination and reassortment of segments to occur, whereby segments from different lineages mix in a single host cell and produce hybrid progeny. The Saaremaa genotype is likely a reassortment as its M segment is closely related to the M segment of the Kurkino genotype, while its S segment is more closely related to the Dobrava and Sochi genotypes. Reassortment is also observed in the Sochi genotype, which has an S segment that forms a sister clade with the S segment of the Dobrava genotype while its other segments are not closely related to the other genotypes.

== Ecology ==
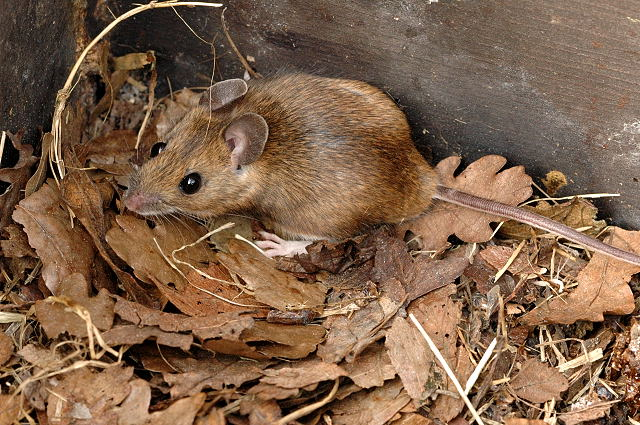
The yellow-necked mouse, the natural reservoir of Dobrava virus

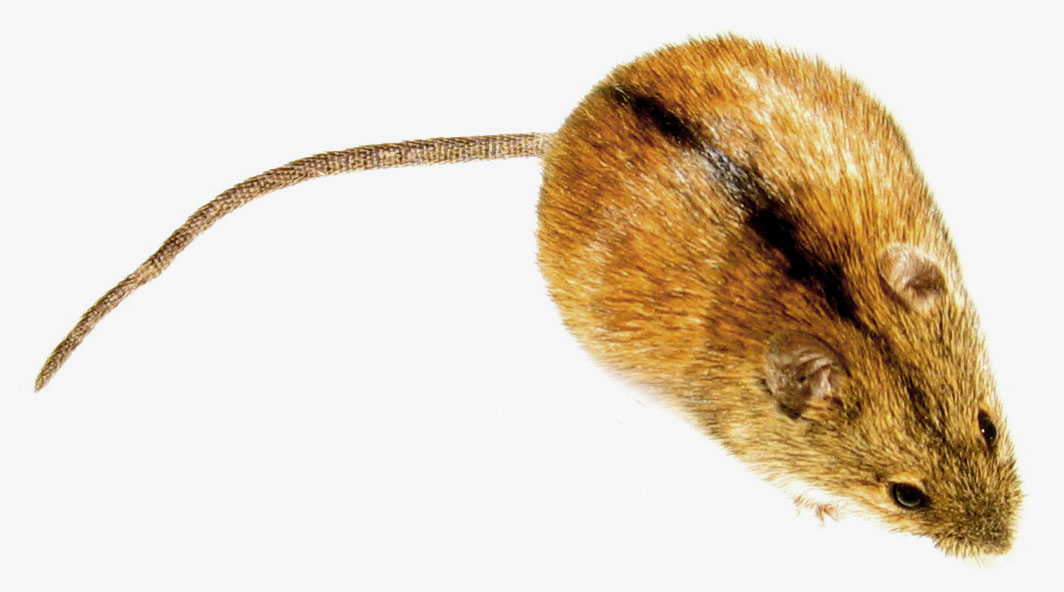
The striped field mouse, the natural reservoir of Kurkino virus and Saaremaa virus

The four genotypes of DOBV have different natural reservoirs. The Dobrava genotype is carried by the yellow-necked mouse (Apodemus flavicollis). The natural reservoir of the Kurkino and Saaremaa genotypes is the striped field mouse (Apodemus agrarius). The Sochi genotype is transmitted by Black Sea field mice (Apodemus ponticus). In southeastern Europe, the yellow-necked mouse is the dominant host of DOBV, and striped field mouse that carry DOBV are also present. In central and eastern Europe, the stripe field mouse is the dominant DOBV host, while in central Europe DOBV-infected yellow-necked mice are also present.

In its rodent hosts, DOBV causes a persistent and asymptomatic infection. Rodent-to-rodent transmission occurs through contact with bodily fluids and through fighting and grooming. Transmission to humans occurs mainly through the inhalation of aerosols that contain rat saliva, urine, or feces. Transmission can also occur through consumption of contaminated food, bites, and scratches.

== Disease ==
Dobrava-Belgrade virus infection can cause hemorrhagic fever with renal syndrome (HFRS). Symptoms usually occur 12–16 days after exposure and come in five phases: fever, hypotension, low urine production, high urine production, then recovery. The disease is hallmarked by acute kidney disease with kidney swelling, excess protein in urine, and blood in urine. Early symptoms include fever, headache, lower back pain, nausea, vomiting, diarrhea, bloody stool, and the appearance of spots on the skin. During the hypotensive phase, there is a sudden lowering of blood pressure and shock due to microvascular leakage. Low urine production then occurs as a result of renal failure. As renal function recovers, urine production increases. A common complication of DOBV infection is acute respiratory distress syndrome (ARDS). In more mild cases, the different phases of illness may be hard to distinguish, or some phases may be absent, while in more severe cases, the phases may overlap.

Disease severity depends on genotype: infection with the Dobrava genotype has moderate-to-severe symptoms with case fatality rate of 10–12%; Sochi virus infection has moderate-to-severe symptoms with a case fatality rate of more than 6%; the Kurkino genotype causes mild-to-moderate HFRS with a case fatality rate of 0.3–0.9%, and the Saaremaa genotype appears to cause a mainly subclinical infection with no mortality. The reason for the disparity in the course of disease by genotype is unknown. DOBV infection is the most common cause of HFRS in southern Europe. The Balkans are the main region affected, but the distribution of DOBV has been spreading since the distribution of its host extends beyond the region.

DOBV infection is diagnosed based on observation of symptoms and testing for hantavirus nucleic acid, proteins, or hantavirus-specific antibodies. Treatment is supportive in nature and includes intravenous hydration, electrolyte therapy, platelet transfusions, and, in cases of kidney injury or failure, intermittent dialysis and continuous renal replacement therapy. About 10% of cases require mechanical ventilation due to the development of ARDS. The main way to prevent infection is to avoid or minimize contact with rodents. Repeated infections of hantaviruses have not been observed, so recovering from infection likely grants life-long immunity.

== Classification ==
Dobrava-Belgrade virus is classified as the species Orthohantavirus dobravaense in the genus Orthohantavirus, which is in the family Hantaviridae, the family that all hantaviruses belong to. The species includes the four genotypes of DOBV. The Ano/Poroia/Afl9/1999 isolate of Dobrava virus is the exemplar virus of the species. This taxonomy is shown hereafter:

- Family: Hantaviridae
  - Genus: Orthohantavirus
    - Species: Orthohantavirus dobravaense, synonymous with Dobrava-Belgrade virus
      - Dobrava virus
      - Kurkino virus
      - Saaremaa virus
      - Sochi virus

== History ==
The Dobrava virus was first isolated in the 1992 from the lung tissue of a yellow-necked mouse captured in Dobrava, Slovenia. At the same time, Belgrade virus was isolated from someone who had severe HFRS. The two viruses were found to be identical, so the virus received the name Dobrava-Belgrade virus. Within a few years, DOBV had been identified throughout Europe and Russia. In 1997, the Saaremaa genotype was discovered in Estonia in striped field mice.

An epidemic of HFRS occurred in 1995 in Croatia during the Balkan Wars among soldiers who lived in poor conditions such as wooden huts in forests. This exposed them to rodents that carried the virus. In addition to DOBV, Puumala virus was also responsible for the 1995 epidemic. Dobrava-Belgrade virus was accepted as a species by the International Committee on Taxonomy of Viruses in 1995 and has undergone a series of changes to its species name, first changing to Dobrava-Belgrade hantavirus, then Dobrava-Belgrade orthohantavirus, and most recently to the current Orthohantavirus dobravaense.
