= Thailand virus =

Virus classification
- (unranked): Virus
- Realm: Riboviria
- Kingdom: Orthornavirae
- Phylum: Negarnaviricota
- Class: Bunyaviricetes
- Order: Elliovirales
- Family: Hantaviridae
- Genus: Orthohantavirus
- Species: Orthohantavirus thailandense
- Virus: Thailand virus

Synonyms
- Thailand hantavirus; Thailand orthohantavirus

Species of virus

Thailand virus (THAIV) is a single-stranded, enveloped, negative-sense RNA orthohantavirus.

== Natural reservoir ==
THAIV was first isolated from rodents in two Thai provinces, Nakhon Pathom Province and Nakhon Ratchasima Province, in 1994. The greater bandicoot rat (Bandicota indica) was found to be the primary reservoir for THAIV. Serological studies have revealed, but not confirmed, other rodents in Thailand as possible reservoirs, including the black rat (Rattus rattus), Polynesian rat (R. exulans), brown rat (R. norvegicus) and lesser rice-field rat (R. losea).

== Virology ==
Thailand virus (THAIV) is genetically diverse from other hantaviruses. The L, M, and S nucleotide segments reveal its most recent ancestor in common to be the Seoul virus (SEOV). However, four recently isolated THAIV strains from R.Rattus show genetic diversity between themselves and are distinct from SEOV in that they show geographical clustering. This is a distinct feature of all hantaviruses, except for SEOV. The SEOV strains have been primarily isolated from R. norvegicus.

== See also ==
- Hantavirus hemorrhagic fever with renal syndrome
