= Prospect Hill virus =

Orthohantavirus prospectense

Virus classification
- (unranked): Virus
- Realm: Riboviria
- Kingdom: Orthornavirae
- Phylum: Negarnaviricota
- Class: Bunyaviricetes
- Order: Elliovirales
- Family: Hantaviridae
- Genus: Orthohantavirus
- Species: Orthohantavirus prospectense

Synonyms
- Prospect Hill hantavirus; Prospect Hill orthohantavirus; Prospect Hill virus

Species of virus

Prospect Hill virus is a single-stranded, negative-sense Hantaan-like zoonotic RNA virus isolated from meadow voles and microtine and other cricetid rodents in the United States. It has a widespread distribution in Pennsylvania, Maryland, West Virginia, Minnesota and California. The overall risk of infection in humans is low. It was first isolated from a meadow vole found in Prospect Hill, Maryland for which it is named.

== See also ==
- Isla Vista virus
- Hantaan River virus
- Bloodland Lake virus
