= Bloodland Lake virus =

Virus classification
- (unranked): Virus
- Realm: Riboviria
- Kingdom: Orthornavirae
- Phylum: Negarnaviricota
- Class: Bunyaviricetes
- Order: Elliovirales
- Family: Hantaviridae
- Genus: Orthohantavirus
- Species: incertae sedis
- Virus: Bloodland Lake virus

Virus

Bloodland Lake virus (BLLV) is a single-stranded, negative-sense RNA virus of New World Orthohantavirus first isolated in a Prairie vole (Microtus ochrogaster) near Bloodland Lake, Fort Leonard Wood, Pulaski County, Missouri in 1994. BLLV has also been isolated in Prairie voles in St. Louis County, Missouri.

== Natural reservoir ==
BLLV is unique to the Prairie vole. At the time of its discovery in Pulaski County in 1994, rats and mice trapped along with the Prairie vole tested negative for the virus but did test positive for other hantaviruses.

== Transmission ==
Transmission is via either direct contact with rodent excreta, or through droplet respiration due to aerosolization of rodent urine, saliva and/or feces. Transmission of hantavirus to humans from arvicoline species in North America has not been documented. To date, the only known transmissions of hantaviruses to humans have come from rats, bats, and mice.

== See also ==
- 1993 Four Corners hantavirus outbreak
