= Choclo virus =

Virus classification
- (unranked): Virus
- Realm: Riboviria
- Kingdom: Orthornavirae
- Phylum: Negarnaviricota
- Class: Bunyaviricetes
- Order: Elliovirales
- Family: Hantaviridae
- Genus: Orthohantavirus
- Species: Orthohantavirus chocloense

Synonyms
- Choclo orthohantavirus; Choclo virus

Species of virus

Choclo virus (CHOV) is a single-stranded, negative-sense RNA zoonotic New World hantavirus. It was first isolated in 1999 in western Panama. The finding marked the first time Hantavirus pulmonary syndrome (HPS) was found in Central America.

During this outbreak, a high seroprevalence was found among the general population, suggesting that this virus has an extremely low pathogenicity and causes sub-clinical to mild symptoms. This was confirmed in a study that infected hamsters with CHOV. All of the hamsters tested positive for CHOV, but none exhibited any symptoms.

== Discovery ==
The virus was first isolated in 2000 from the spleen of a northern pygmy rice rat captured in Las Tablas, Los Santos in the Los Santos Province in western Panama and is named after the El Choclo neighborhood near the city.

== Transmission ==
Choclo virus has not been shown to transfer from person-to-person. Transmission by aerosolized rodent excreta still remains the only known way the virus is transmitted to humans. In general, droplet and/or fomite transfer has not been shown in the hantaviruses in general, in either the hemorrhagic or pulmonary forms.

== Epidemiology ==
There were a total of eleven cases reported but only nine serologically confirmed cases of Choclo virus found in this outbreak. A serologic survey of residents in the area revealed a 13% antibody prevalence. No person-to-person transmissions were found. There were no fatalities among serologically confirmed cases. The three fatalities could not be tested for the virus due to the absence of samples available. Before this outbreak, there were no documented cases of human hantavirus infections in Central America.

== See also ==
- Andes virus
- 1993 Four Corners hantavirus outbreak
