= Microtus javaensis =

Microtus javaensis Temporal range: Early Pleistocene

Scientific classification
- Kingdom: Animalia
- Phylum: Chordata
- Class: Mammalia
- Order: Rodentia
- Family: Cricetidae
- Subfamily: Arvicolinae
- Genus: Microtus
- Species: †M. javaensis

Binomial name
- †Microtus javaensis Martin & Fox, 2023

Extinct species of mammal

Microtus javaensis is an extinct species of Pedomys that inhabited South Dakota during the Early Pleistocene.
