= Phasmaviridae =

Virus classification
- (unranked): Virus
- Realm: Riboviria
- Kingdom: Orthornavirae
- Phylum: Negarnaviricota
- Class: Bunyaviricetes
- Order: Elliovirales
- Family: Phasmaviridae

Family of viruses

Phasmaviridae is a family of viruses with negative stranded RNA genomes associated with insect hosts. The family belongs to the order Elliovirales. Phasmaviruses were first discovered in phantom midges of the genus Chaoborus in 2014.

== Taxonomy ==
The family contains the following genera:

- Cicadellivirus
- Feravirus
- Hymovirus
- Jonvirus
- Orthophasmavirus
- Sawastrivirus
- Wuhivirus

== Ferak feravirus ==
Feravirus ferakinum, a member of the genus Feravirus, has been isolated in cell culture. The virion is enveloped and spherical with a diameter of 80–120 nanometers. The genome has three segments L (6.8 kilobases), M (4.2 kilobases) and S (1.5 kilobases). It encodes five proteins—the polymerase on the L segment, the p12G and the Gc-Gn protein on the M segment and the N and p12 proteins in the S segment.

A Gn–Gc glycoprotein dimer binds to the cell receptor. The virus is endocytosed and escapes into the cytoplasm where it replicates. It is released from the cell by budding.
