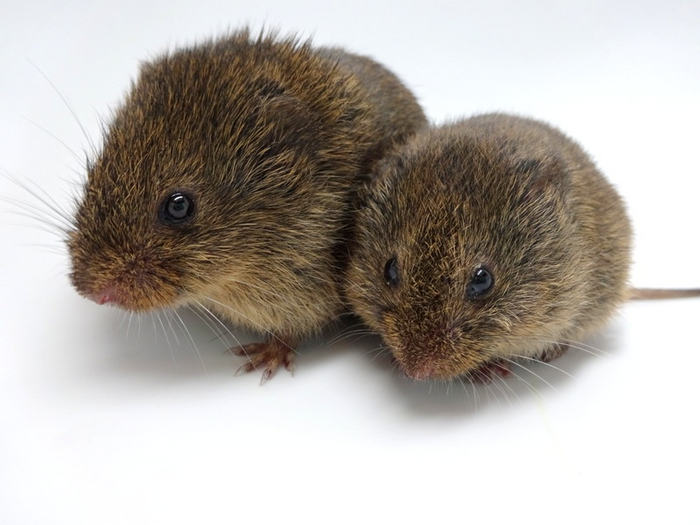

Conservation status
- Least Concern (IUCN 3.1)

Scientific classification
- Kingdom: Animalia
- Phylum: Chordata
- Class: Mammalia
- Infraclass: Placentalia
- Order: Rodentia
- Family: Cricetidae
- Subfamily: Arvicolinae
- Genus: Microtus
- Subgenus: Pedomys; Baird, 1857
- Species: M. ochrogaster

Binomial name
- Microtus ochrogaster (Wagner, 1842)

Synonyms
- Arvicola austerus LeConte, 1853; Hypudaeus ochrogaster Wagner, 1842; Microtus ludovicianus V. Bailey, 1900

= Prairie vole =

Species of mammal

The prairie vole (Microtus ochrogaster) is a small vole found in central North America.

== Description ==
The vole has long, coarse grayish-brown fur on the upper portion of the body and yellowish fur on the lower portion of the body. It has short ears and a short tail, which is somewhat darker on top. Prairie voles rarely live longer than one or two years. Their life expectancy is based on predator presence and natural factors in their area of inheritance.

== Taxonomy ==
The prairie vole's scientific name, Microtus ochrogaster, is derived from Latin; the genus name translates to "small ear", and the specific epithet translates to "yellow belly".

== Distribution ==
They are found in grasslands in the central United States and Canada; ranging from the eastern Rocky Mountains in the west to West Virginia in the east and into the Canadian Prairies to the north.

An isolated relict subspecies was once known from the Western Gulf coastal grasslands in Texas and Louisiana, named the Louisiana vole; it were reportedly abundant in the 1900s, but is now considered extinct, making the prairie vole extirpated from Louisiana.

== Habitat ==
The prairie vole resides in dry fields that contain a cover of grasses and weeds; the largest populations are typically found in fallow fields or hay fields. Prairie voles make shallow burrows and runways through surface vegetation. In winter, they tunnel underneath the snow. Their runways are used for many purposes, from predator protection to obtaining food. Prairie voles are easily disturbed. They will not hesitate to use their burrows if they notice predators close by or disturbances that pose a threat. Compared to the meadow vole, prairie voles prefer to inhabit drier areas.

== Behavior ==
Prairie voles are active year-round. In colder weather, they tend to be more active during the day; at other times, they are mainly nocturnal. Prairie voles live in colonies and have been known to exhibit human-like social behavior in groups.

=== Pair bonding ===
Prairie voles are noted for pair bonding with their partners. The male prairie vole has continuous contact with its female counterpart, which lasts for all of their lives. If the female prairie vole dies, the male does not look for a new partner. Moreover, this constant relationship is more social than sexual. Related species, such as the meadow voles, do not show this pair bonding behavior. This uniqueness in the prairie vole behavior is related to the oxytocin and vasopressin hormones. The oxytocin receptors of the female prairie vole brain are located more densely in the reward system, and have more receptors than other species, which causes 'addiction' to the social behavior. In the male prairie vole, the gene for the vasopressin receptor has a longer segment, as opposed to the montane vole, which has a smaller segment. Considerable work is needed to determine the extent to which research results from vole models may apply to bonding animals such as humans and non-bonding animals such as chimpanzees.

== Diet and ecology ==
Prairie voles are primarily herbivorous, feeding on grasses, roots, fruit, seeds and bark and some insects. These voles store food. Predators include coyotes, hawks, owls, foxes and prairie rattlesnakes. They may cause damage to garden plants and small trees.

== Reproduction ==
During mating season, prairie voles take up individual territories and defend them from other voles. They mark their territories with urine and other secretions. They assume a defensive posture towards a competitor or enemy by raising the forefeet, extending the head forward, and chattering of the teeth. Outside the mating seasons, the prairie voles live together.

Like other voles, prairie voles can reproduce at any time of the year, but the main breeding seasons are in the fall and the spring. Unlike other voles, prairie voles are generally monogamous. The prairie vole is a notable animal model for studying monogamous behavior and social bonding because male and female partners form lifelong pair bonds, huddle and groom each other, share nesting and pup-raising responsibilities, and generally show a high level of affiliate behavior. However, they are not sexually faithful, and though pair-bonded females usually show aggression toward unfamiliar males, both sexes will occasionally mate with other voles if the opportunity arises.

The female's gestation period is between 20 and 30 days. Female voles have two to four litters of two to seven young per year in a nest lined with vegetation in a burrow or in a depression on the ground. Litter size varies depending on food availability and the age of the female. The largest number of pregnancies with the highest number of offspring occur in spring and fall. Vole pups open their eyes at about eight days after birth, and become capable of feeding themselves at about two weeks.

== Interactions with humans ==
Prairie voles are important to the ecosystem. They provide food for predators, but are considered pests by some. Many ways to prevent voles from destroying gardens or other areas are available. Electric repellers and predators (snakes, owls, coyotes, foxes, domestic animals, and hawks) can be used to reduce vole populations. They can also be scared away by plastic ornaments that resemble natural predators.

Though poison is an option to prevent voles, poisoned voles can create a threat to other animals and humans. Voles are prey for other predators. If they are eaten by predators while poisoned, the poison could harm the predator. In addition, when placing poison near vole entrances, other animals may be able to reach it, making it a hazard to them. Moreover, poison left in the field can easily be blown or washed away. In residential areas, the poison itself and poisoned voles can be harmful and/or dangerous to people and domesticated animals. If a licensed pest control company is involved they can mitigate any poisoning concerns through the use of proper exterior bait stations.

=== Natural reservoir ===
Prairie voles in Missouri have been found to carry Bloodland Lake virus (BLLV), a hantavirus. Hantaviruses are responsible for disease in humans including Hantavirus pulmonary syndrome and Hantavirus hemorrhagic fever with renal syndrome. No known human cases of Bloodland Lake virus have been reported.
