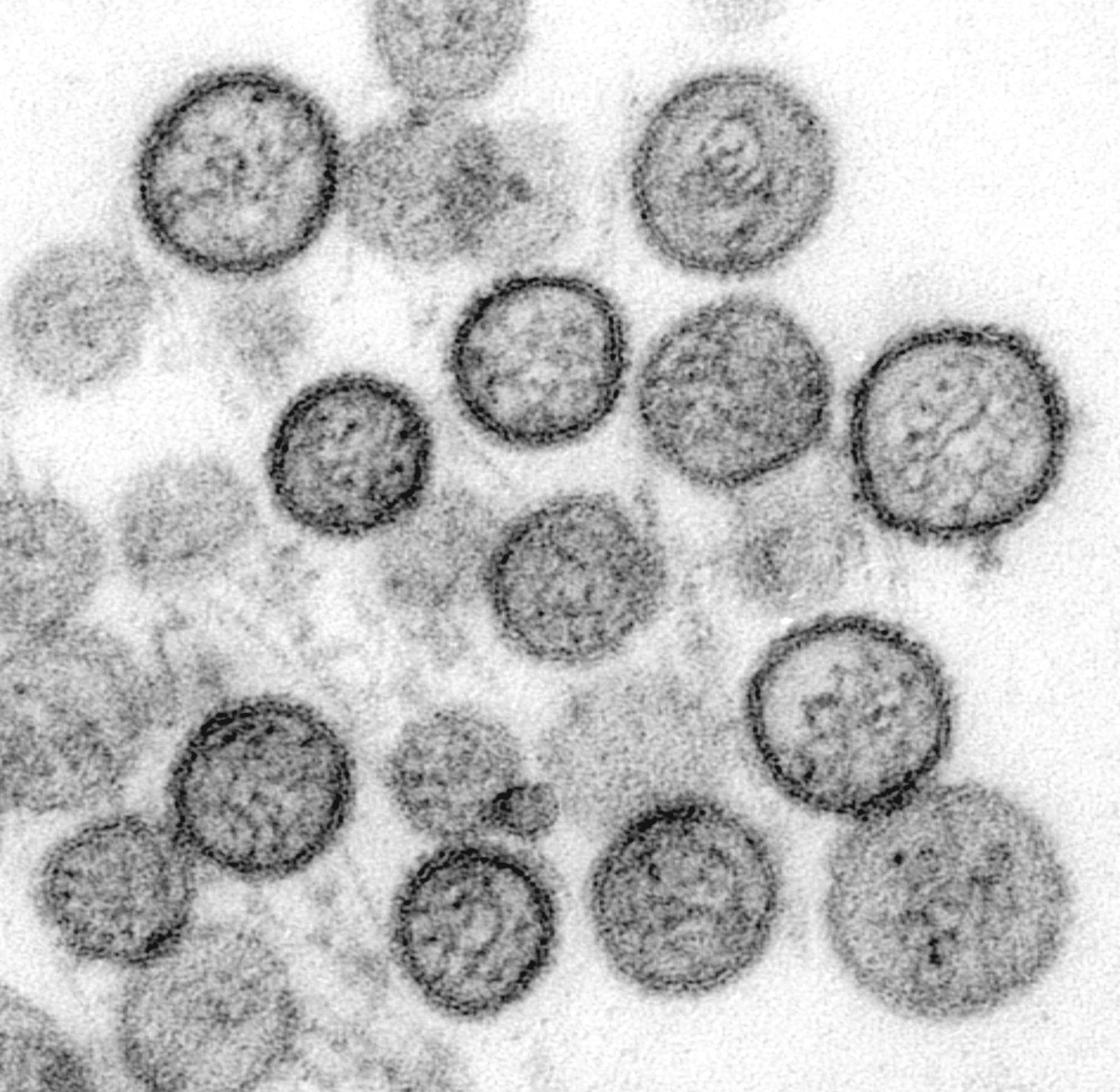
- Transmission electron micrograph of Sin Nombre virus

Virus classification
- (unranked): Virus
- Realm: Riboviria
- Kingdom: Orthornavirae
- Phylum: Negarnaviricota
- Class: Bunyaviricetes
- Order: Elliovirales
- Family: Hantaviridae
- Subfamily: Mammantavirinae
- Genus: Orthohantavirus

Species
- #Classification

Synonyms
- Hantavirus

= Hantavirus =

Orthohantavirus

Genus of viruses

Orthohantavirus is a genus of viruses which includes all hantaviruses that cause disease in humans. Hantaviruses are naturally found primarily in rodents, like those in the family Cricetidae. In general, each hantavirus is carried by one rodent species and each rodent that carries a hantavirus carries one hantavirus species. Hantaviruses in their natural reservoirs usually cause an asymptomatic, persistent infection. In humans, however, hantaviruses cause two diseases: hemorrhagic fever with renal syndrome (HFRS) and hantavirus pulmonary syndrome (HPS). HFRS is mainly caused by hantaviruses in Africa, Asia, and Europe, called Old World hantaviruses, and HPS is usually caused by hantaviruses in the Americas, called New World hantaviruses.

Hantaviruses are transmitted mainly through aerosols and droplets that contain rodent excretions, as well as through contaminated food, bites, and scratches. Environmental factors such as rainfall, temperature, and humidity influence transmission. HFRS is marked by kidney disease with kidney swelling, excess protein in urine, and blood in urine. The case fatality rate of HFRS varies from less than 1% to 15% depending on the virus. A mild form of HFRS called nephropathia epidemica is often caused by Puumala virus and Dobrava-Belgrade virus. For HPS, initial symptoms are flu-like, with fever, headache, and muscle pain, followed by sudden respiratory failure. HPS has a higher case fatality rate than HFRS, at 30–60%. For both HFRS and HPS, illness is the result of increased vascular permeability, decreased platelet count, and overreaction of the immune system.

The hantavirus genome consists of three single-stranded negative-sense RNA segments that encode one protein each: an RNA-dependent RNA polymerase (RdRp), a spike glycoprotein precursor, and the N protein. Segments are encased in N proteins to form ribonucleoprotein (RNP) complexes that each have a copy of RdRp attached. RNP complexes are surrounded by a lipid envelope that has spike proteins emanating from its surface. Replication begins when spikes attach to the surface of cells. After entering the cell, the envelope fuses with endosomes and lysosomes, which empties RNPs into the cytoplasm. RdRp then transcribes the genome to produce messenger RNA (mRNA) for translation by host ribosomes to produce viral proteins and replicates the genome for progeny viruses. Old World hantaviruses assemble in the Golgi apparatus and obtain their envelope from it, before being transported to the cell membrane to leave the cell via exocytosis. New World hantaviruses assemble near the cell membrane and obtain their envelope from it as they leave the cell by budding from its surface.

Hantaviruses were first discovered following the Korean War. During the war, HFRS was a common ailment in soldiers stationed near the Hantan River. The first hantavirus was isolated in 1978 in South Korea and was named Hantaan virus. It was shown to be responsible for the outbreak during the war. Within a few years, other hantaviruses that cause HFRS were discovered throughout Eurasia. In 1982, the World Health Organization gave HFRS its name, and in 1987, hantaviruses were classified as a genus for the first time. In 1993, an outbreak of HPS occurred in the Four Corners region in the United States, which led to the discovery of pathogenic New World hantaviruses and the second disease caused by hantaviruses. Since then, hantaviruses have been found not just in rodents but also in moles, shrews, and bats.

== Disease ==
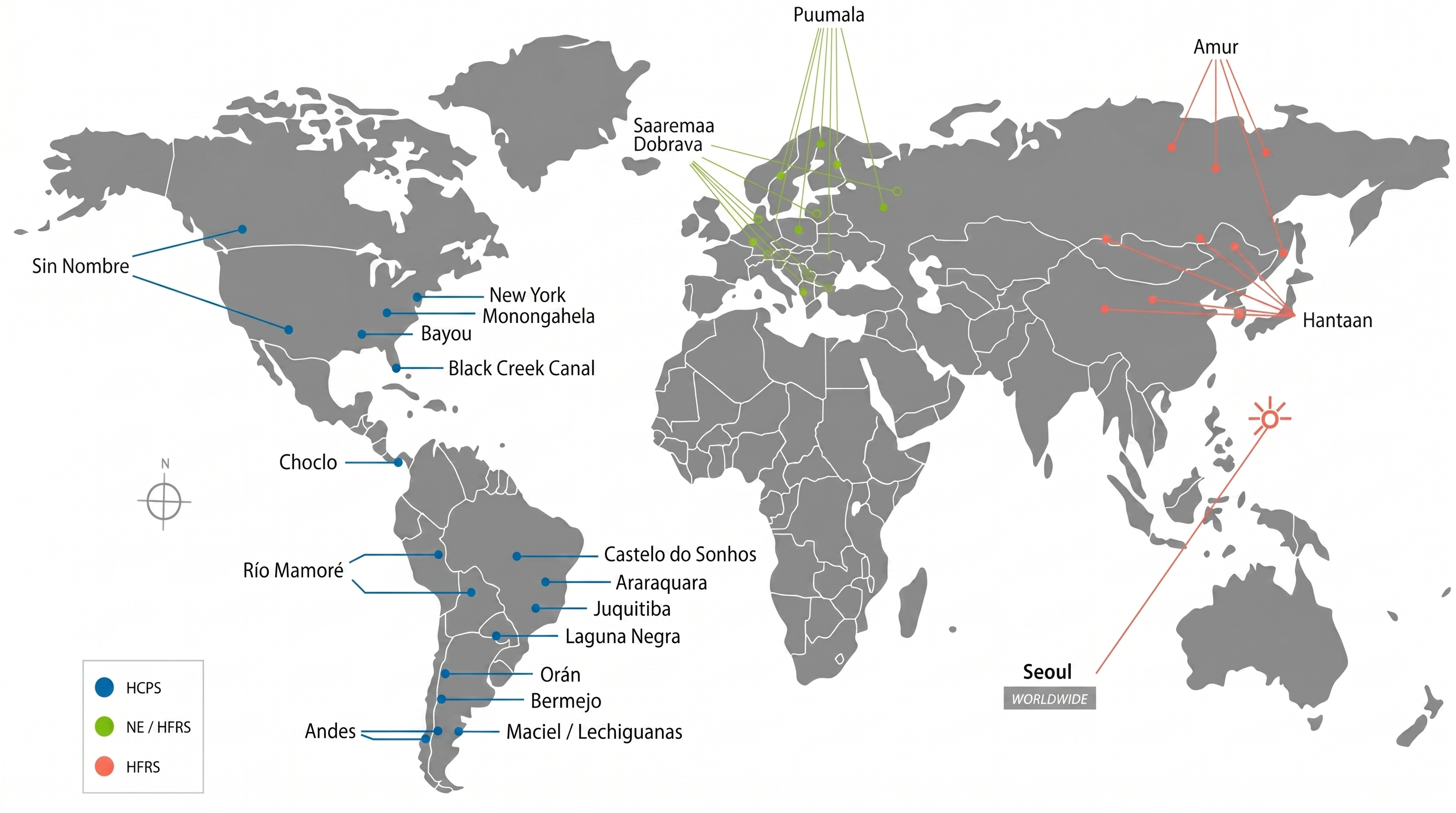
World distribution of select hantaviruses
HCPS
NE/HFRS
HFRS

Hantaviruses are sorted into Old World hantaviruses (OWHVs), which typically cause hemorrhagic fever with renal syndrome (HFRS) in Africa, Asia, and Europe, and New World hantaviruses (NWHVs) which are associated with hantavirus pulmonary syndrome (HPS) in the Americas. The case fatality rate of HFRS ranges from less than 1% to 15%, while for HPS it is 30–60%. The severity of symptoms of HFRS varies depending on the virus: Hantaan virus causes severe HFRS, Seoul virus moderate HFRS, Puumala virus mild HFRS, and Dobrava-Belgrade virus infection varies from mild to severe depending on genotype. The mild form of HFRS caused by Puumala virus and Dobrava-Belgrade virus is often called nephropathia epidemica (NE). Repeated infections of hantaviruses have not been observed, so recovering from infection likely grants life-long immunity.

HFRS is characterized by five phases: febrile, hypotensive, low urine production (oliguria), high urine production (polyuria), and recovery. Symptoms usually occur 12–16 days after exposure to the virus. Acute kidney disease occurs with kidney swelling, excess protein in urine (proteinuria), and blood in urine (hematuria). Other symptoms include headache, lower back pain, nausea, vomiting, diarrhea, bloody stool, the appearance of spots on the skin (petechiae), and hemorrhaging in the respiratory tract. Renal failure leads to oliguria, and restoration of kidney health comes with polyuria. Recovery typically takes a few months. In more mild cases, the different phases of HFRS may be hard to distinguish, or some phases may be absent, while in more severe cases, the phases may overlap.

HPS is mainly caused by two viruses: Andes virus and Sin Nombre virus. The disease has three phases: prodromal (early), cardiopulmonary, and recovery. Symptoms occur about 1–8 weeks after exposure to the virus. Early symptoms include fever, headache, muscle pain, shortness of breath (dyspnea), and low platelet count (thrombocytopenia). During the cardiopulmonary phase, there is elevated heart rate (tachycardia), irregular heartbeats (arrhythmias), and cardiogenic shock. Pulmonary capillary leakage can lead to acute respiratory distress syndrome, buildup of fluids in the lungs (pulmonary edema), hypotension, and buildup of fluid in the chest cavity (pleural effusion). These symptoms can cause sudden death. After the cardiopulmonary phase is resolved, recovery typically takes 3 to 6 months, with polyuria. While HFRS is associated with renal disease and HPS with cardiopulmonary disease, HFRS may sometimes include cardiopulmonary symptoms associated with HPS and HPS may sometimes include renal symptoms associated with HFRS.

== Transmission ==
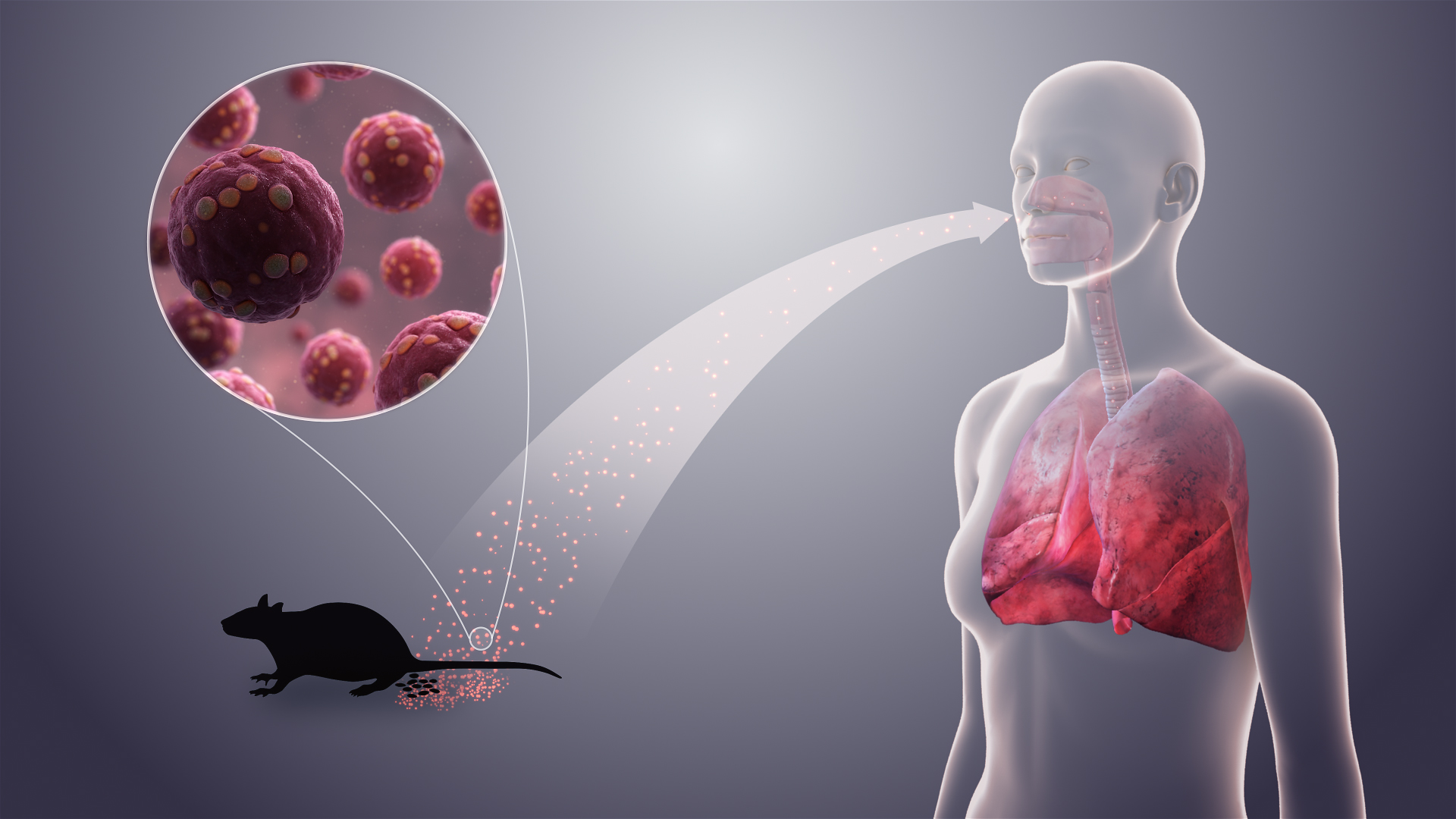
Hantavirus transmission

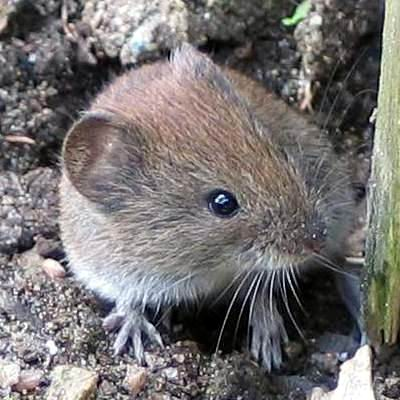
The bank vole, the natural reservoir of Puumala virus

The western deer mouse, the natural reservoir of Sin Nombre virus

Hantaviruses that cause illness in humans are mainly transmitted by rodents. In rodents, hantaviruses usually cause an asymptomatic, persistent infection. Infected animals can spread the virus to uninfected animals through aerosols or droplets from their feces, urine, saliva, and blood, through consumption of contaminated food, from virus particles shed from skin or fur, via grooming, or through biting and scratching. Hantaviruses can also spread through the fecal-oral route and across the placenta during pregnancy from mother to child. They can survive for 10 days at room temperature, 15 days in a temperate environment, and more than 18 days at 4 °C (39 °F), which aids in the transmission of the virus. Environmental conditions favorable to the reproduction and spread of rodents are known to increase disease transmission. Living in a rural environment, in unhygienic settings, and interacting with environments shared with hosts are the biggest risk factors for infection, especially among people who are hikers, farmers, and forestry workers, as well as those in mining, the military, and zoology.

Human-to-human transmission of Andes virus is sometimes reported. Although a systematic review of research did not find sufficient evidence of such transmission, many experts consider it to be possible between close contacts while noting that ANDV is not highly transmissible. It can reportedly spread through human saliva, airborne droplets from coughing and sneezing, and possibly to newborns through breast milk or the placenta. There is also suspicion that Puumala virus can spread from person to person through blood and platelet transfusions.

Hantaviruses that cause HFRS can be transmitted through the bites of mites and ticks. Research has also shown that pigs can be infected with Hantaan virus without severe symptoms, and sows can transmit the virus to offspring through the placenta. Pig-to-human transmission may also be possible; one swine breeder was infected with hantavirus with no contact with rodents or mites. Hantaan virus and Puumala virus have been detected in cattle, deer, and rabbits, and antibodies to Seoul virus have been detected in cats and dogs, but the role of these hosts for hantaviruses is unknown. Hantaviruses can also spread among rats kept as pets. For example, in an outbreak in North America in 2017, Seoul virus infected 31 people through contact with pet rats. In addition to rodents, some hantaviruses are found in small insectivorous mammals, such as moles, shrews, and bats. Hantavirus antigen, indicative of infection, has also been detected in a variety of bird species. Infection in other animals can potentially facilitate the evolution of hantaviruses by gene reassortment.

Human built environments are important in hantavirus transmission. Deforestation and excess agriculture may destroy rodents' natural habitat. The expansion of agricultural land is associated with a decline in predator populations, which enables hantavirus host species to use farm monocultures as nesting and foraging sites. Agricultural sites built in close proximity to rodents' natural habitats can facilitate the proliferation of rodents as they may be attracted to animal feed. Sewers and stormwater drainage systems may be inhabited by rodents, especially in areas with poor solid waste management. Maritime trade and travel have also been implicated in the spread of hantaviruses. Research results are inconsistent on whether urban living increases or decreases hantavirus incidence. Seroprevalence, which shows past infection to hantavirus, is consistently higher in occupations and areas that have greater exposure to rodents. Poor living conditions on battlefields, in military camps, and in refugee camps expose soldiers and refugees to infection.

== Environment ==
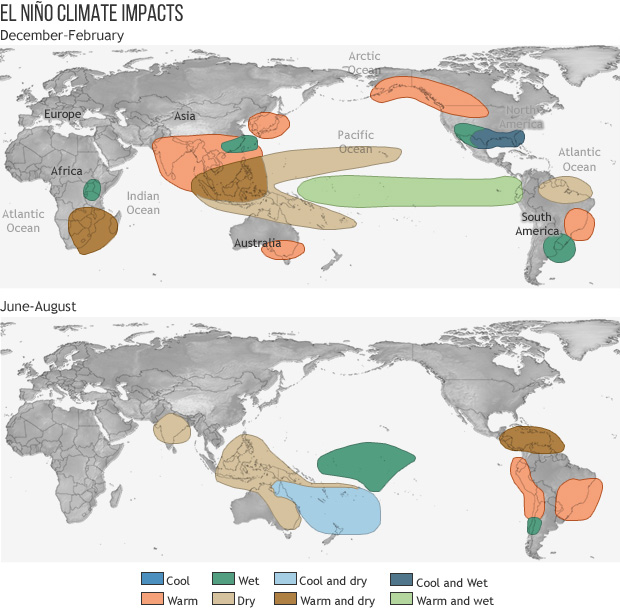
El Niño's effect on local climates

Rodent species that carry hantaviruses inhabit a diverse range of habitats, including desert-like biomes, equatorial and tropical forests, swamps, savannas, fields, and salt marshes. The seroprevalence of hantaviruses in their host species has been observed to range from 5.9% to 38% in the Americas, and 3% to about 19% worldwide, depending on testing method and location. In some places, such as South Korea, routine trapping of wild rodents is performed to surveil hantavirus circulation. High humidity can benefit rodent populations in warm climates, where it may positively impact plant growth and thus food availability. Increased forest coverage is associated with increased hantavirus incidence, particularly in Europe.

Climate change and environmental degradation increase contact areas between rodent hosts and humans, which increases potential exposure to hantaviruses. An example of this was the 1993 Four Corners outbreak in the United States, which was immediately preceded by elevated rainfall from the 1992–1993 El Niño warming period. This caused a substantial growth in the food supply for rodents, which led to rapid growth in their population and facilitated greater spread of the hantavirus that caused that outbreak.

Rainfall is consistently associated with hantavirus incidence in various patterns. Heavy rainfall is a risk factor for outbreaks in the following months, but may negatively affect incidence by flooding rodent burrows and nests. In places that have wet and dry seasons, infections are more common in the wet season than in the dry season. Low rainfall and drought are associated with decreased incidence since such conditions result in a smaller rodent population, but displacement of rodent populations via drought or flood can lead to an increase in rodent-human interactions and infections. In Europe, however, no association between rainfall and disease incidence has been found.

Temperature has varying effects on hantavirus transmission. Higher temperatures create unfavorable environments for virus survival and decreases activity levels of Neotropic rodents, but it can cause rodents to seek shelter from heat in human settings and is beneficial for aerosol production. Lower temperature can prolong virus survival outside a host. Higher average winter temperature is associated with reduced survival of bank voles, the natural reservoir of Puumala virus, but increased survival of striped field mice in China, the natural reservoirs of Hantaan virus. Extreme temperatures, whether hot or cold, are associated with lower disease incidence.

== Genome and structure ==
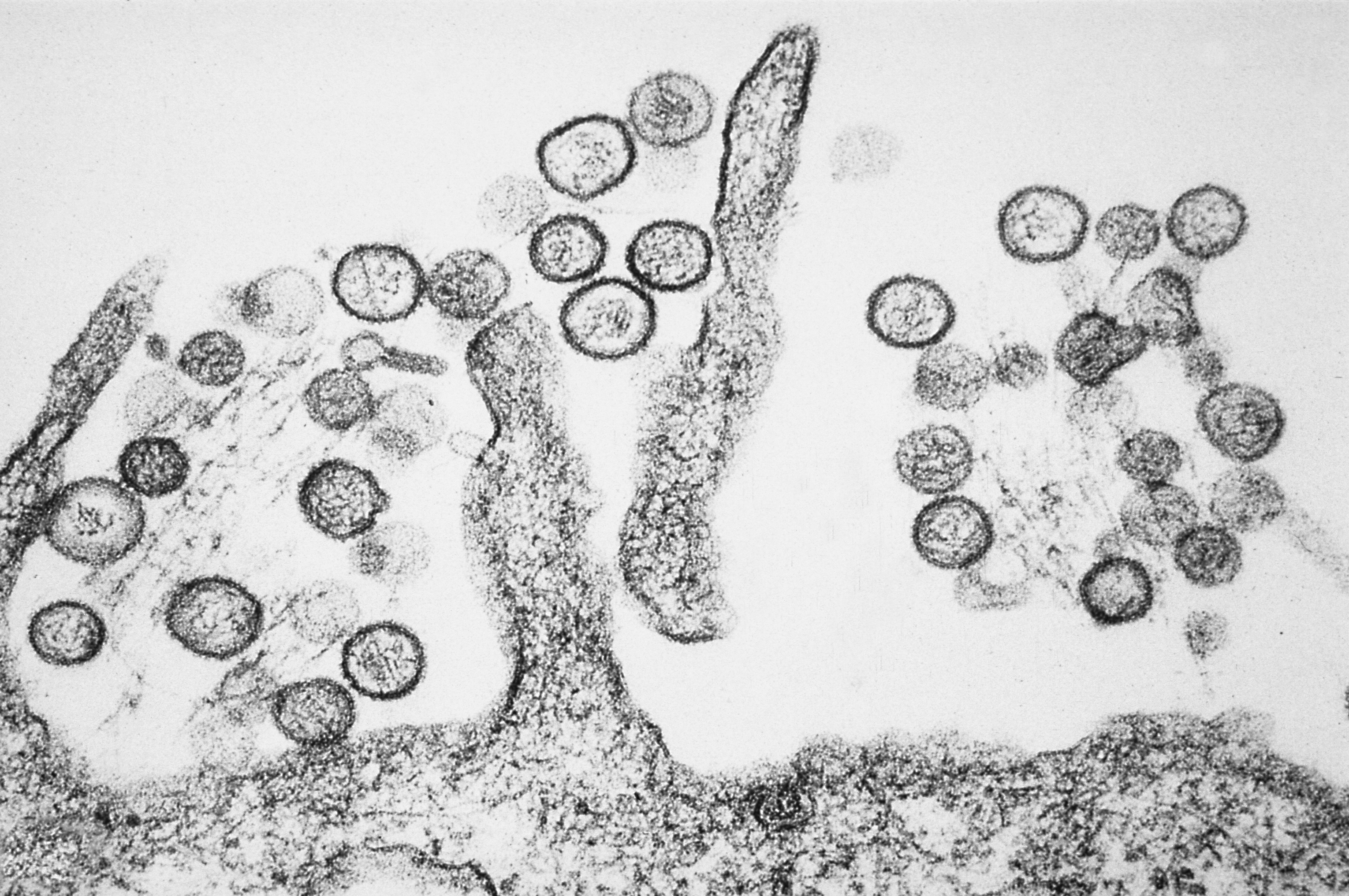
A transmission electron micrograph of Sin Nombre virus

The genome of hantaviruses is segmented into three parts: the large (L), medium (M), and small (S) segments. Each part is a single-stranded negative-sense RNA strand and consists of 10,000–15,000 nucleotides in total. The segments form into circles via non-covalent bonding of the ends of the genome. The L segment is about 6.6 kilobases (kb) in length and encodes a viral RNA-dependent RNA polymerase (RdRp), which mediates transcription and replication of viral RNA. The M segment, about 3.7 kb in length, encodes a glycoprotein precursor that is co-translated and cleaved into Gn and Gc. Gn and Gc bind to cell receptors, regulate immune responses, and induce protective antibodies. The S segment is around 2.1 kb in length and encodes the nucleocapsid protein N, which binds to and protects viral RNA. An open reading frame in the N gene on the S segment of some orthohantaviruses also encodes the non-structural protein NS that inhibits interferon production in host cells. The untranslated regions at the ends of the genome are highly conserved and participate in the replication and transcription of the genome.

Individual hantavirus particles (virions) are usually spherical, but may be oval, pleomorphic, or tubular. The diameter of the virion is 70–350 nanometers (nm). The outer part of the virion is a lipid envelope that is about 5 nm thick. Embedded in the envelope are the surface spike glycoproteins Gn and Gc, which are arranged in a lattice pattern. Each surface spike is composed of a tetramer of Gn and Gc (four units each) that has four-fold rotational symmetry, and extends about 10 nm out from the envelope. Gn forms the stalk of the spike and Gc the head. Inside the envelope are helical nucleocapsids made of many copies of the nucleocapsid protein N, which are attached to the virus's genome to form ribonucleoprotein (RNP) complexes. Each RNP complex has a copy of RdRp attached to it. Hantaviruses do not encode matrix proteins to assist with structuring the virion, so how surface proteins organize into a sphere with a symmetrical lattice is not yet known.

== Life cycle ==
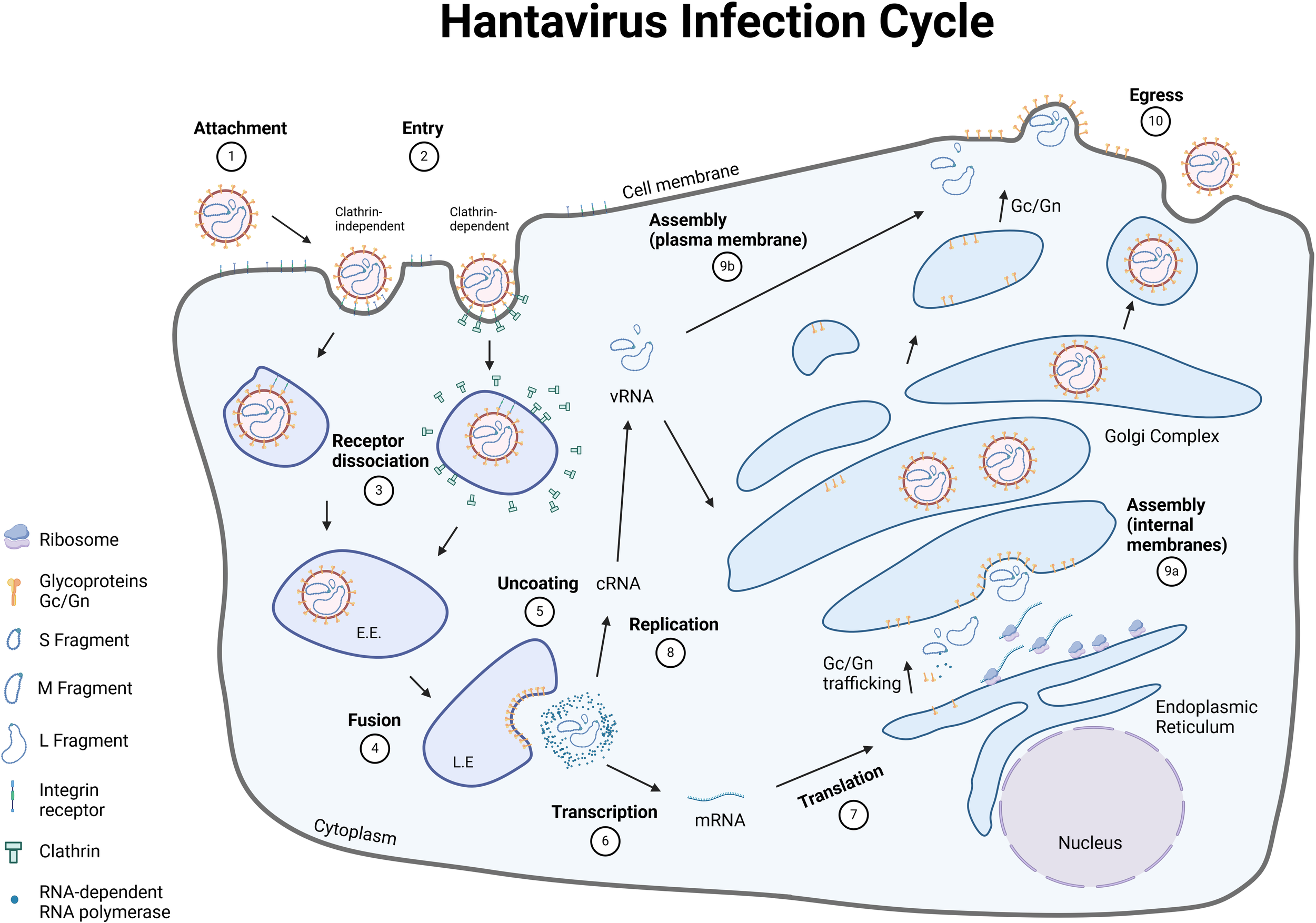
Ten major steps of the hantavirus life cycle.

Vascular endothelial cells and macrophages are the primary cells infected by hantaviruses. Podocytes, tubular cells, dendritic cells, and lymphocytes can also be infected. Attachment and entry into the host cell is mediated by the binding of the viral glycoprotein spikes to host cell receptors, particularly β3 integrins. Decay acceleration factors, complement receptors, and, for New World hantaviruses, protocadherin-1 have also been proposed to be involved in attachment. After attachment, hantaviruses rely on several ways to enter a cell, including micropinocytosis, clathrin-independent receptor-mediated endocytosis and cholesterol- or caveolae-dependent endocytosis. Old World hantaviruses use clathrin-dependent endocytosis while New World hantaviruses use clathrin-independent endocytosis.

After entering a cell, virions form vesicles that are transported to early endosomes, then late endosomes and lysosomal compartments. A decrease in pH then causes the viral envelope to fuse with the endosome or lysosome. This fusion releases viral ribonucleoprotein complexes into the cell cytoplasm, which initiates transcription and replication by RdRp. RdRp transcribes viral –ssRNA into complementary positive-sense strands, then snatches 5′ ("five prime") ends of host messenger RNA (mRNA) to prepare mRNA for translation by host ribosomes to produce viral proteins. Complementary RNA strands are also used to produce copies of the genome, which are encapsulated by N proteins to form RNPs.

During virion assembly, the glycoprotein precursor is cleaved in the endoplasmic reticulum into the Gn and Gc glycoproteins by host cell signal peptidases. Gn and Gc are modified by N-glycan chains, which stabilize the spike structure and assist in assembly in the Golgi apparatus for Old World hantaviruses or at the cell membrane for New World hantaviruses. Old World hantaviruses obtain their viral envelope from the Golgi apparatus and are then transported to the cell membrane in vesicles to leave the cell via exocytosis. On the other hand, New World hantavirus RNPs are transported to the cell membrane, where they bud from the surface of the cell to obtain their envelope and leave the cell.

== Evolution ==
Orthohantavirus phylogeny

- - - - - - - - - - Artybash virus
                  - - Asikkala virus
                    - Kenkeme virus
                - Asama virus
              - - Wùfeng Chodsigoa smithii orthohantavirus 1
                - Cao Bằng virus
            - - Bowé virus
              - Jeju virus
          - - Tigray virus
            - Bruges virus
      - - - - - - Lanka virus
                - Thailand virus
            - Seoul virus
          - - Dobrava virus
            - Sangassou virus
        - - Hantaan virus
          - Dàbiéshān virus
  - - - - - - - - Puumala virus
                - Khabarovsk virus
              - Tatenale virus
            - Tula virus
          - Prospect Hill virus
        - - Lúxī virus
          - Fúgòng virus
      - Rockport virus
    - - - Sin Nombre virus
        - - Carrizal virus
          - Montaño virus
      - - - - - - Andes virus
                - Rio Mamoré virus
              - Maporal virus
            - Choclo virus
          - Caño Delgadito virus
        - - Bayou virus
          - Black Creek Canal virus

A phylogenetic tree of orthohantaviruses based on S and M genome segment sequences

The most common form of evolution for hantaviruses is mutations through single nucleotide substitutions, insertions, and deletions. Hantaviruses are usually restricted to individual natural reservoir species and evolve alongside their hosts, but this one-species-one-hantavirus relationship is not true for all hantaviruses. The exact evolutionary history of hantaviruses is likely obscured by many instances of genome reassortment, host spillover, and host-switching. Within species, geography has affected the evolution of hantaviruses. For example, Hantaan virus and Seoul virus have both formed multiple lineages corresponding to their geographic distribution.

Because hantaviruses have segmented genomes, they are capable of genetic recombination and reassortment in which segments from different viruses can combine to form new viruses. This occurs often in nature and facilitates the adaptation of hantaviruses to multiple hosts and ecosystems. Recombination in OWHVs of the S and M segments is usually observed amongst viruses within species, but can occur between species. Reassortment in NWHVs of the S and M segments has been observed in rodents. Among Puumala viruses isolated from rodents in 2005–2009, 19.1% of them were identified as reassortments. Diploid progeny are also possible, in which virions may possess two of the same segment from two parent viruses.

== Classification ==
Orthohantaviruses belong to the family Hantaviridae, which contains all hantaviruses. The genus has 37 species, listed hereafter with the exemplar virus of the species. In general, species bear the name of the exemplar virus with the suffix -ense.

- Orthohantavirus andesense, Andes virus
- Orthohantavirus artybashense, Artybash virus
- Orthohantavirus asamaense, Asama virus
- Orthohantavirus asikkalaense, Asikkala virus
- Orthohantavirus bayoui, Bayou virus
- Orthohantavirus boweense, Bowé virus
- Orthohantavirus brugesense, Bruges virus
- Orthohantavirus caobangense, Cao Bằng virus
- Orthohantavirus carrizalense, Carrizal virus
- Orthohantavirus chocloense, Choclo virus
- Orthohantavirus dabieshanense, Dàbiéshān virus
- Orthohantavirus delgaditoense, Caño Delgadito virus
- Orthohantavirus dobravaense, Dobrava-Belgrade virus (Note: The exemplar virus of Orthohantavirus dobravaense is Dobrava virus, a genotype of Dobrava-Belgrade virus. In scientific papers, "Dobrava-Belgrade virus" is essentially used as a synonym for Orthohantavirus dobravaense.)
- Orthohantavirus fugongense, Fúgòng virus
- Orthohantavirus hantanense, Hantaan virus
- Orthohantavirus jejuense, Jeju virus
- Orthohantavirus kenkemeense, Kenkeme virus
- Orthohantavirus khabarovskense, Khabarovsk virus
- Orthohantavirus lankaense, Lanka virus
- Orthohantavirus luxiense, Lúxī virus
- Orthohantavirus mamorense, Rio Mamoré virus
- Orthohantavirus maporalense, Maporal virus
- Orthohantavirus montanoense, Montaño virus
- Orthohantavirus nigrorivense, Black Creek Canal virus
- Orthohantavirus ozarkense, Ozark virus
- Orthohantavirus prospectense, Prospect Hill virus
- Orthohantavirus puumalaense, Puumala virus
- Orthohantavirus rockportense, Rockport virus
- Orthohantavirus sagercreekense, Sager Creek virus
- Orthohantavirus sangassouense, Sangassou virus
- Orthohantavirus seoulense, Seoul virus
- Orthohantavirus sinnombreense, Sin Nombre virus
- Orthohantavirus tatenalense, Tatenale virus
- Orthohantavirus thailandense, which contains Anjozorobe virus and Thailand virus (Note: Orthohantavirus thailandense bears the name of Thailand virus but its exemplar virus is Anjozorobe virus.)
- Orthohantavirus tigrayense, Tigray virus
- Orthohantavirus tulaense, Tula virus
- Orthohantavirus wufangense, Wùfeng Chodsigoa smithii orthohantavirus 1

Many other hantaviruses are unclassified, though some may be isolates of other viruses:

- Academ virus
- Adler virus
- Alto Paraguay virus
- Amga virus/Seewis virus
- Anajatuba virus
- Ash River virus
- Asturias virus
- Azagny virus
- Belgrade virus
- Biya river virus
- Bloodland Lake virus
- Blue River virus
- Boginia virus
- Calabazo virus
- Camp Ripley virus
- Castelo dos Sonhos virus
- CGRn9415 virus
- Dode virus
- El Moro Canyon virus
- Fox Creek virus
- Fusong virus
- Gōu virus
- hantavirus sp. strain Tamarin/BRA/SM22/2014
- HoJo virus
- Iamonia virus
- Isla Vista virus
- Jemez Springs virus
- Jerboa hantavirus
- Jurong virus
- Kielder hantavirus
- Laguna Negra virus
- Landiras virus
- Leakey virus
- Lechiguanas virus
- Liánghé virus
- Lohja virus
- Malacky virus
- Muleshoe virus
- Necocli virus
- Orán virus
- Oxbow virus
- Playa de Oro virus
- Powell Butte virus
- Prairie vole virus
- Qiān Hú Shān virus/Qiāndǎo Lake virus
- Rio Mearim virus
- Rio Segundo virus
- Sapporo rat virus
- Sarufutsu virus
- Serang virus
- Shěnyáng virus
- Taimyr virus
- Tanganya virus
- Tualatin River virus
- Uurainen virus
- Vladivostok virus
- Yakeshi virus
- Yuánjiāng virus

== History ==
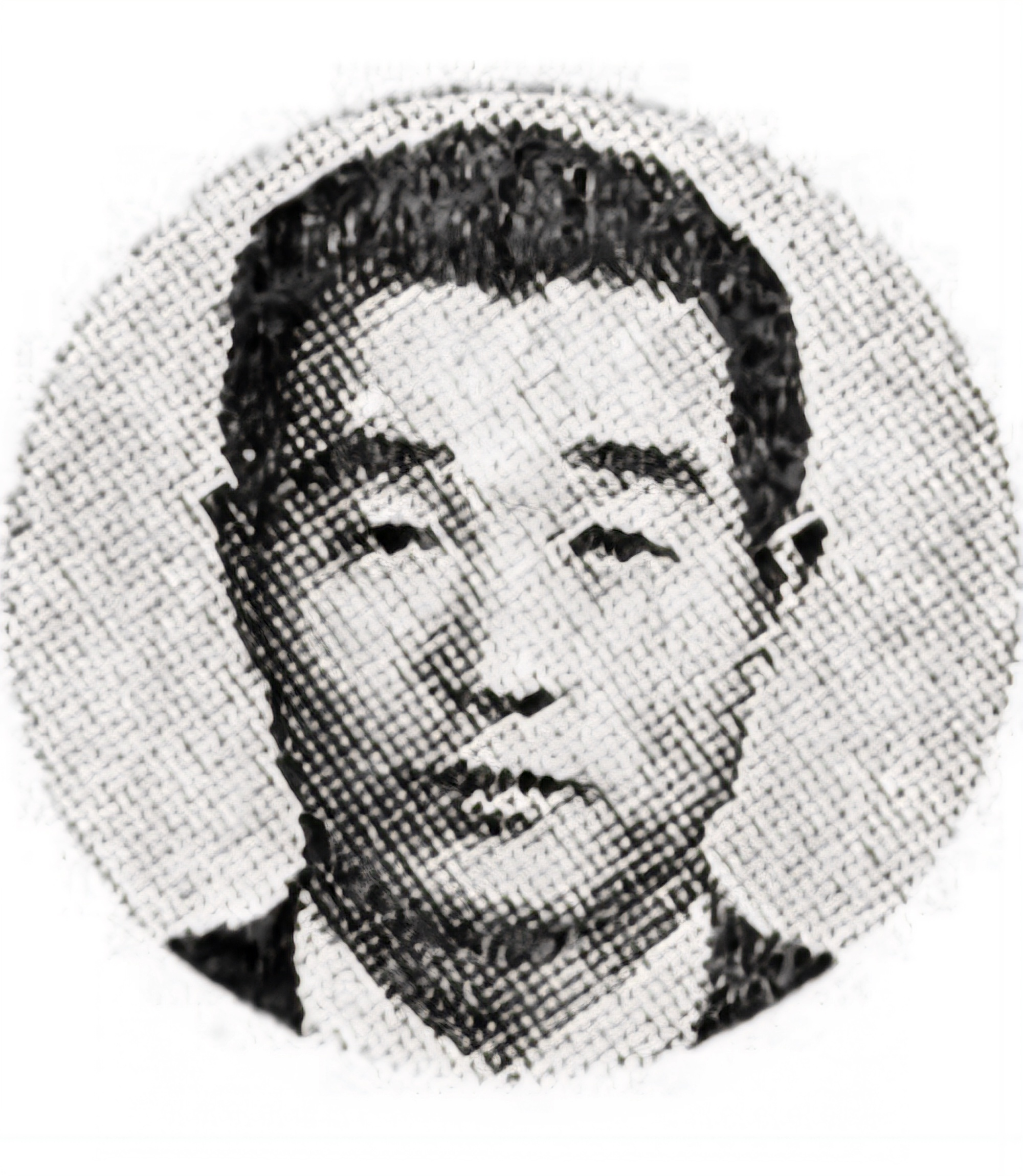
Ho Wang Lee, 1972

Hantavirus hemorrhagic disease was likely first described in the Huangdi Neijing, an ancient Chinese medical text, in Imperial China during the Warring States Period of 475–221 BCE. Hantaviruses have been suggested as a cause of "trench nephritis" in soldiers during the US Civil War and in British soldiers in Flanders, Belgium during the First World War. The disease was also mentioned in East Asia, where it was probably endemic, and was first described scientifically in Vladivostok in 1913–1914. During the Second World War in 1942, an outbreak of disease with symptoms characteristic of hantavirus infection occurred in Salla, Eastern Lapland, Finland among German and Finnish soldiers. This outbreak was later reported in 1980 to be caused by a virus transmitted by bank voles and was named Puumala virus. Also during the war, around 10,000 Japanese soldiers stationed in Manchuria developed HFRS.

Around 3,200 cases of HFRS occurred among United Nations soldiers stationed near the Hantan River during the Korean War, where it was first identified in 1951 and named "Korean hemorrhagic fever" and "epidemic hemorrhagic fever". After the war, in 1976 in South Korea, Ho Wang Lee tested striped field mice and showed that antigens from their lungs were reactive to antibodies in sera from war survivors. In 1978, the virus was isolated for the first time, and in 1980, it was named Hantaan virus after the river. Retrospective analysis showed that Hantaan virus was responsible for the viral outbreak during the war. Other hantaviruses that caused HFRS were then discovered throughout Eurasia. The disease had a variety of names, so in 1982, the World Health Organization officially named it hemorrhagic fever with renal syndrome. In 1985, this group of viruses were named "hantaviruses" after Hantaan virus, and in 1987, the genus Hantavirus was established to accommodate them in the then-family Bunyaviridae. During the 1980s, Lee and his team developed the first hantavirus vaccine, Hantavax, to prevent HFRS. The first paper on the vaccine was published in 1988, and it was licensed by the Korean government in 1990.

In 1993, an outbreak of highly lethal acute respiratory distress syndrome occurred in the Four Corners region of the United States. This outbreak was determined to be caused by a hantavirus, now named Sin Nombre virus, and represented the first confirmed instance of pathogenic hantaviruses in the Americas as well as the discovery of a new type of disease caused by hantaviruses. The new disease was named hantavirus pulmonary syndrome. In subsequent years, numerous other hantaviruses were discovered in the Americas. HFRS, however, remains much more common than HPS—more than 100,000 cases of HFRS occur each year, compared to only a few hundred cases of HPS annually.

Over time, hundreds of bunyaviruses were discovered but could not be accommodated within the genera of the Bunyaviridae family. To address this, in 2017 bunyaviruses were elevated to the rank of order, Bunyavirales, and hantaviruses, along with the other bunyavirus genera, were elevated to the rank of family. Hantaviruses, also called hantavirids, now also refer to members of the family Hantaviridae. The prior genus of Hantavirus was renamed Orthohantavirus to distinguish them from members of the family, and the genus's members are often called orthohantaviruses. In 2019, additional genera and subfamilies were created to classify non-rodent hantaviruses, and in 2023, binomial nomenclature was adopted for hantaviruses.

== See also ==
- 2012 Yosemite hantavirus outbreak
- MV Hondius hantavirus outbreak
