= Tula virus =

Virus classification
- (unranked): Virus
- Realm: Riboviria
- Kingdom: Orthornavirae
- Phylum: Negarnaviricota
- Class: Bunyaviricetes
- Order: Elliovirales
- Family: Hantaviridae
- Genus: Orthohantavirus
- Species: Orthohantavirus tulaense
- Virus: Tula virus

Synonyms
- Tula hantavirus; Tula orthohantavirus

Species of virus

Tula virus (TULV), is a single-stranded, negative-sense RNA virus species of orthohantavirus first isolated from a European common vole (Microtus arvalis) found in Central Russia and primarily carried by rodents. It causes Hantavirus hemorrhagic fever with renal syndrome. The Microtus species are also found in North America, Europe, Scandinavia, Slovenia, Asia, and Western Russia. Human cases of Tula virus have also been reported in Switzerland and Germany.
