= Hantaan virus =

Virus classification
- (unranked): Virus
- Realm: Riboviria
- Kingdom: Orthornavirae
- Phylum: Negarnaviricota
- Class: Bunyaviricetes
- Order: Elliovirales
- Family: Hantaviridae
- Genus: Orthohantavirus
- Species: Orthohantavirus hantanense
- Virus: Hantaan virus

Synonyms
- Hantaan hantavirus; Hantaan orthohantavirus

Species of virus

Hantaan virus (HTNV) is the main cause of hemorrhagic fever with renal syndrome (HFRS) in East Asia. Hantaan virus is transmitted by the striped field mouse (Apodemus agrarius). In its natural reservoir, HTNV causes a persistent, asymptomatic infection and is spread through excretions, fighting, and grooming. Humans can become infected by inhaling aerosols that contain rodent saliva, urine, or feces, as well as through bites and scratches. In humans, infection causes symptoms such as fever and headache, as well as the appearance of spots on the skin, hepatitis, and renal symptoms such as kidney swelling, excess protein in urine, blood in urine, decreased urine production, and kidney failure. Rarely, HTNV infection affects the pituitary gland and can cause empty sella syndrome. The case fatality rate from infection is up to 6.3%.

The genome of HTNV is about 11.9 kilobases (kb) in length and segmented into three negative-sense, single-stranded RNA (-ssRNA) strands. The small strand encodes the viral nucleoprotein, the medium strand encodes the viral spike protein, which attaches to cell receptors for entry into cells, and the long strand encodes the viral RNA-dependent RNA polymerase (RdRp), which replicates and transcribes the genome. Genome segments are encased in nucleoproteins to form ribonucleoprotein (RNP) complexes that are surrounded by a viral envelope that contains spikes emanating from its surface.

Hantaan virus replicates first by binding to the surface of cells with its envelope spikes. Virus particles, called virions, are then taken into the cell by endosomes, where a drop in pH causes the viral envelope to fuse with the endosome, which releases viral RNA into the host cell. RdRp then transcribes the genome for translation by host cell ribosomes and produces copies of the genome for progeny viruses. New virions are assembled at the endoplasmic reticulum and bud from its surface to obtain their viral envelope. Progeny viruses are then transported by a cellular vesicle to the cell membrane, where they leave the cell by exocytosis.

HTNV was discovered in 1976 then isolated in 1978 after being extracted from striped field mice. The virus was subsequently linked to a past outbreak among soldiers in the Korean War who were stationed near the Hantan river and for that was named after the river. Hantaan virus was the first hantavirus to be discovered, and the group is named after the virus. The vast majority of HFRS cases occur in China, where Hantaan virus is responsible for up to 70% of cases. Cases of HFRS caused by Hantaan virus also occur in South Korea, Russia, and Vietnam.

== Genome ==
The genome of Hantaan virus is about 11.8 thousand nucleotides in length and segmented into three negative-sense, single-stranded RNA (-ssRNA) strands. The segments form into circles via non-covalent bonding of the ends of the genome. The small segment, about 1.7 kilobases (kb) in length, encodes the viral nucleoprotein. The medium segment, about 3.62 kb in length, encodes a glycoprotein precursor that is cleaved into the two spike proteins Gn and Gc during virion assembly. The large segment, about 6.53 kb in length, encodes the viral RNA-dependent RNA polymerase (RdRp), which is responsible for transcribing and replicating the genome. The ends of each segment contain untranslated terminal regions (UTRs) that are involved in the replication and transcription of the genome.

== Structure ==
Virions are mostly spherical or pleomorphic in shape and range from 80 to 160 nm in diameter. They contain a lipid envelope covered in spike proteins made of the two viral glycoproteins, Gn and Gc. The spike proteins extend about 10 nm out from the surface and are tetrameric, consisting of four copies each of Gn and Gc with helical symmetry, in which Gn forms the stalk of the spike and Gc the head. Spikes are arranged on the surface in a lattice pattern. Inside the envelope are the three genome segments, which are encased in nucleoproteins to form a ribonucleoprotein (RNP) complex. Attached to each RNP complex is a copy of RdRp.

== Life cycle ==
HTNV primarily infects endothelial cells and macrophages. It enters cells by using β3-integrins as receptors. Virions are taken into a cell via an endosome. Once pH is lowered, the viral envelope fuses with the endosome, which releases viral RNA into the host cell's cytoplasm. The small segment is transcribed by RdRp first, then the medium segment, and lastly the large segment. Once the genome has been transcribed, RdRp snatches caps from host messenger RNA (mRNA) to create viral mRNA that is primed for translation by host ribosomes to produce viral proteins.

For replication of the genome, a complementary positive-sense strand is produced by RdRp. Copies of the genome are made from this complementary strand. Progeny RNA strands are then encapsidated by nucleoproteins. During replication, the glycoprotein is cleaved in the endoplasmic reticulum by the host signal peptidase during translation. This produces Gn at the N-terminus and Gc at the C-terminus of the protein. Spike proteins are expressed on the surface of the endoplasmic reticulum. Viral RNPs are transported to the endoplasmic reticulum where they bud from the surface, thereby obtaining their envelope. Progeny viruses are then transported by a cellular vesicle to the cell membrane, where they leave the cell via exocytosis.

== Evolution ==
The most common way that hantaviruses evolve is through mutations of individual nucleotides being inserted, deleted, or substituted. Because Hantaan virus has a segmented genome, it is possible for recombination and reassortment of segments to occur, whereby segments from different lineages mix in a single host cell and produce hybrid progeny. In China, a recombinant strain of HTNV was discovered in which recombination had occurred with a different species of hantavirus. In another instance, an isolate from brown rats (Rattus norvegicus) was found to have reassorted with a virus in another species, Seoul virus.

== Ecology ==
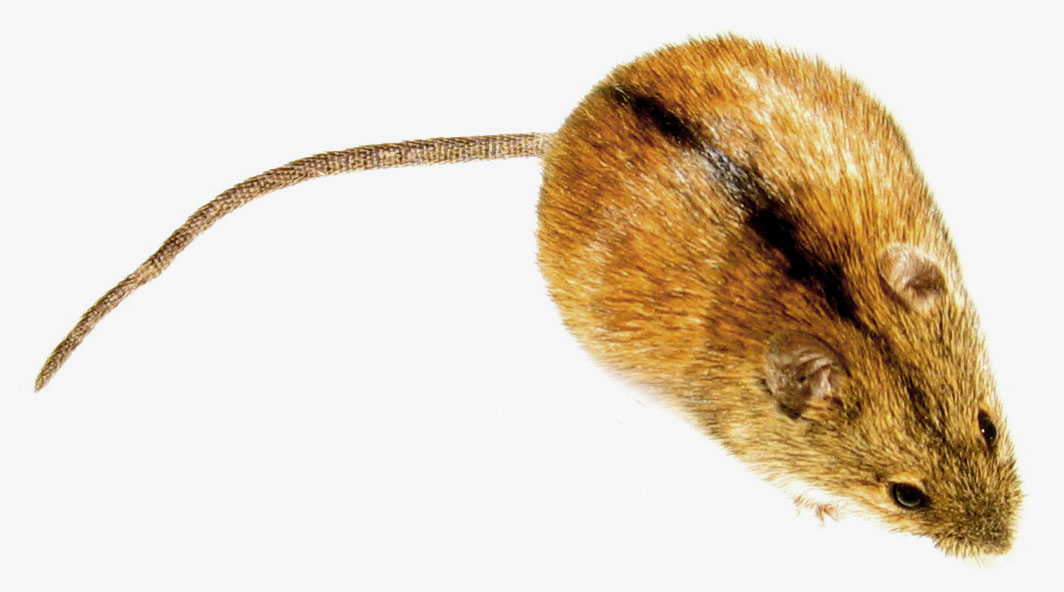
The striped field mouse, the natural reservoir of Hantaan virus

Hantaan virus is transmitted by striped field mice (Apodemus agrarius). These mice mainly reside in rural areas, where they frequently use crop fields as a source of food. Spillover events in which HTNV spreads from striped field mice to brown rats (Rattus norvegicus) are common. Parasitic mites of striped field mice have been found to be infected with Hantaan virus, which suggests that they can transmit the virus to mammals they parasitize. Antibodies to Hantaan virus have been detected in cattle, deer, and rabbits, but the role of these animals as hosts is unknown.

In its rodent hosts, HTNV causes a persistent and mainly asymptomatic infection. Rodent-to-rodent transmission occurs through contact with bodily fluids and through fighting and grooming. Transmission to humans occurs mainly through the inhalation of aerosols that contain rat saliva, urine, or feces. Transmission can also occur through consumption of contaminated food, bites, and scratches. Infections with Hantaan virus mainly occur in rural settings such as in residences near crop fields or in such fields. In China, cases most commonly occur during the autumn harvest season when farmers work on and sometimes sleep in crop fields.

== Disease ==
Hantaan virus infection can cause hemorrhagic fever with renal syndrome (HFRS). Symptoms usually occur 12–16 days after exposure and come in five phases: fever, hypotension, low urine production, high urine production, then recovery. The disease is hallmarked by acute kidney disease with kidney swelling, excess protein in urine, and blood in urine. Early symptoms include fever, headache, lower back pain, nausea, vomiting, diarrhea, bloody stool, and the appearance of spots on the skin. During the hypotensive phase, there is a sudden lowering of blood pressure and shock due to microvascular leakage. Low urine production then occurs as a result of renal failure. As renal function recovers, urine production increases. The case fatality rate is up to 6.3%. A rare complication of HTNV infection is impaired pituitary gland function. HTNV can cause bleeding and atrophy of the anterior pituitary lobe and empty sella syndrome. In more mild cases, the different phases of illness may be hard to distinguish, or some phases may be absent, while in more severe cases, the phases may overlap.

Infection with Hantaan virus mainly occurs in China and South Korea, but also in Russia and Vietnam. The vast majority of HFRS cases in the world are in China, and Hantaan virus is responsible for up to 70% of cases. 9,000–12,000 cases occur each year in China, and about 400–600 per year in South Korea. HTNV infection is diagnosed based on observation of symptoms and testing for hantavirus nucleic acid, proteins, or hantavirus-specific antibodies. Treatment is supportive in nature and includes intravenous hydration, electrolyte therapy, platelet transfusions, and, in cases of kidney injury or failure, intermittent dialysis and continuous renal replacement therapy. Avoiding or minimizing contact with rodents is key to prevent infection. In China and South Korea, bivalent vaccines for Seoul virus and Hantaan virus are available for use. Repeated infections of hantaviruses have not been observed, so recovering from infection likely grants life-long immunity.

== Classification ==
Hantaan virus is classified into the species Orthohantavirus hantanense in the genus Orthohantavirus, which is in the family Hantaviridae, the family that all hantaviruses belong to. Other members of Orthohantavirus hantanense include Amur virus and Soochong virus. The 76-118 isolate of Hantaan virus is the exemplar virus of the species. This taxonomy is shown hereafter:

- Family: Hantaviridae
  - Genus: Orthohantavirus
    - Species: Orthohantavirus hantanense
      - Amur virus
      - Hantaan virus
      - Soochong virus

== History ==
During the Korean War, around 3,200 cases of epidemic disease occurred from 1951 to 1954 among United Nations soldiers stationed near the Hantan river in northern South Korea. This disease received the name "Korean hemorrhagic fever". Infected people experienced typical symptoms of HFRS, including headache, fever, chills, anorexia, vomiting, as well as commonly hypotension and bleeding in the kidneys. The case fatality rate at first was over 10% but dropped to about 5%. Because of how severe the epidemic was, the US military established a hemorrhagic fever center close to where most cases occurred. Suspected cases were airlifted to the hospital for treatment. The disease at that time was named Korean hemorrhagic fever.

In 1976, Ho Wang Lee (Korean: 이호왕) showed that antigens taken from the lungs of striped field mice were reactive to antibodies from sera of people who had Korean hemorrhagic fever. The virus couldn't be isolated in 1976 but testing showed that an infectious agent was responsible. The virus was isolated for the first time in 1978 and named "KHF strain 76-118". It was propagated in cell cultures for the first time in 1981 and renamed "Hantaan virus, strain 76-118" after the Hantan river. Around the same time, other viruses related to Hantaan virus that caused HFRS were discovered throughout Asia and Europe. This group of newly discovered were given the name "hantaviruses", taking the name of Hantaan virus.

Hantaan virus was accepted as a species by the International Committee on Taxonomy of Viruses in 1987, and with it the establishment a genus for hantaviruses. It has undergone a series of changes to its species name, first changing to Hantaan hantanavirus, then Hantaan orthohantavirus, and most recently to the current Orthohantavirus hantanense. In 1989, the method to diagnose Hantaan virus infection was developed by Lee and just a year later he developed a vaccine against it, which made him the first person in history to discover the cause of a viral disease, develop a method to diagnose it, and develop a vaccine against it.
