= Seoul virus =

Virus classification
- (unranked): Virus
- Realm: Riboviria
- Kingdom: Orthornavirae
- Phylum: Negarnaviricota
- Class: Bunyaviricetes
- Order: Elliovirales
- Family: Hantaviridae
- Genus: Orthohantavirus
- Species: Orthohantavirus seoulense
- Virus: Seoul virus

Synonyms
- Seoul hantavirus; Seoul orthohantavirus

Species of virus

Seoul virus (SEOV) is one of the main causes of hemorrhagic fever with renal syndrome (HFRS). Seoul virus is transmitted by the brown rat (Rattus norvegicus) and the black rat (Rattus rattus). In its natural reservoirs, SEOV causes an asymptomatic, persistent infection and is spread through excretions, fighting, and grooming. Humans can become infected by inhaling aerosols that contain rodent saliva, urine, or feces, as well as through bites and scratches. In humans, infection leads to HFRS, an illness characterized by general symptoms such as fever and headache, as well as the appearance of spots on the skin and renal symptoms such as kidney swelling, excess protein in urine, blood in urine, decreased urine production, and kidney failure. The case fatality rate from infection is 1–2%.

The genome of SEOV is about 12 kilobases (kb) in length and segmented into three negative-sense, single-stranded RNA (-ssRNA) strands. The small strand encodes the viral nucleoprotein, the medium strand encodes the viral spike protein, which attaches to cell receptors for entry into cells, and the long strand encodes the viral RNA-dependent RNA polymerase (RdRp), which replicates and transcribes the genome. Genome segments are encased in nucleoproteins to form ribonucleoprotein (RNP) complexes that are surrounded by a viral envelope that contains spikes emanating from its surface.

SEOV replicates first by binding to the surface of cells with its envelope spikes. Virus particles, called virions, are then taken into the cell by endosomes, where a drop in pH causes the viral envelope to fuse with the endosome, which releases viral RNA into the host cell. RdRp then transcribes the genome for translation by host cell ribosomes and produces copies of the genome for progeny viruses. New virions are assembled at the endoplasmic reticulum and bud from its surface to obtain their viral envelope. Progeny viruses are then transported by a cellular vesicle to the cell membrane, where they leave the cell by exocytosis.

SEOV was first discovered in a brown rat in 1980 in Seoul, South Korea. Within a few years of its discovery, it was found in numerous countries and has since been found in Africa, Asia, Europe, and the Americas due to the global distribution of its natural reservoirs. Most cases of SEOV infection occur in China and South Korea. Globally, SEOV accounts for about a quarter of all HFRS cases. SEOV has been found in pet rats, but is not a major public health concern. For laboratory rats, various measures such as culling and screening for SEOV are performed to prevent SEOV infection.

== Genome ==
The genome of Seoul virus is about 12 thousand nucleotides in length and segmented into three negative-sense, single-stranded RNA (-ssRNA) strands. The segments form into circles via non-covalent bonding of the ends of the genome. The small segment, about 1.77 kilobases (kb) in length, encodes the viral nucleoprotein. The medium segment, about 3.65 kb in length. encodes a glycoprotein precursor that is cleaved into the two spike proteins Gn and Gc during virion assembly. The large segment, about 6.53 kb in length, encodes the viral RNA-dependent RNA polymerase (RdRp), which is responsible for transcribing and replicating the genome. The ends of each segment contain untranslated terminal regions (UTRs) that are involved in the replication and transcription of the genome.

== Structure ==
Virions are mostly spherical or pleomorphic in shape and range from 80 to 160 nm in diameter. They contain a lipid envelope covered in spike proteins made of the two viral glycoproteins, Gn and Gc. The spike proteins extend about 10 nm out from the surface and are tetrameric, consisting of four copies each of Gn and Gc with helical symmetry, in which Gn forms the stalk of the spike and Gc the head. Spikes are arranged on the surface in a lattice pattern. Inside the envelope are the three genome segments, which are encased in nucleoproteins to form a ribonucleoprotein (RNP) complex. Attached to each RNP complex is a copy of RdRp.

== Life cycle ==
SEOV primarily infects endothelial cells and macrophages. It enters cells by using β3-integrins as receptors. Virions are taken into a cell via an endosome. Once pH is lowered, the viral envelope fuses with the endosome, which releases viral RNA into the host cell's cytoplasm. The small segment is transcribed by RdRp first, then the medium segment, and lastly the large segment. Once the genome has been transcribed, RdRp snatches caps from host messenger RNA (mRNA) to create viral mRNA that is primed for translation by host ribosomes to produce viral proteins.

For replication of the genome, a complementary positive-sense strand is produced by RdRp. Copies of the genome are made from this complementary strand. Progeny RNA strands are then encapsidated by nucleoproteins. During replication, the glycoprotein is cleaved in the endoplasmic reticulum by the host signal peptidase during translation. This produces Gn at the N-terminus and Gc at the C-terminus of the protein. Spike proteins are expressed on the surface of the endoplasmic reticulum. Viral RNPs are transported to the endoplasmic reticulum where they bud from the surface, thereby obtaining their envelope. Progeny viruses are then transported by a cellular vesicle to the cell membrane, where they leave the cell via exocytosis.

== Diversity ==
Six lineages of SEOV have been described based on the medium genome segment, number lineages 1–6. Lineages 1, 2, 3, and 5 have been isolated in China and lineage 6 in the UK and Brazil. Lineage 4 is more widespread, having been isolated from China, South Korea, Japan, Singapore, Vietnam, and the USA.

== Evolution ==
The most common way that hantaviruses evolve is through mutations of individual nucleotides being inserted, deleted, or substituted. Because Seoul virus has a segmented genome, it is possible for recombination and reassortment of segments to occur, whereby segments from different lineages mix in a single host cell and produce hybrid progeny. For Seoul virus, this has been observed in the S and M segments in the wild.

== Ecology ==
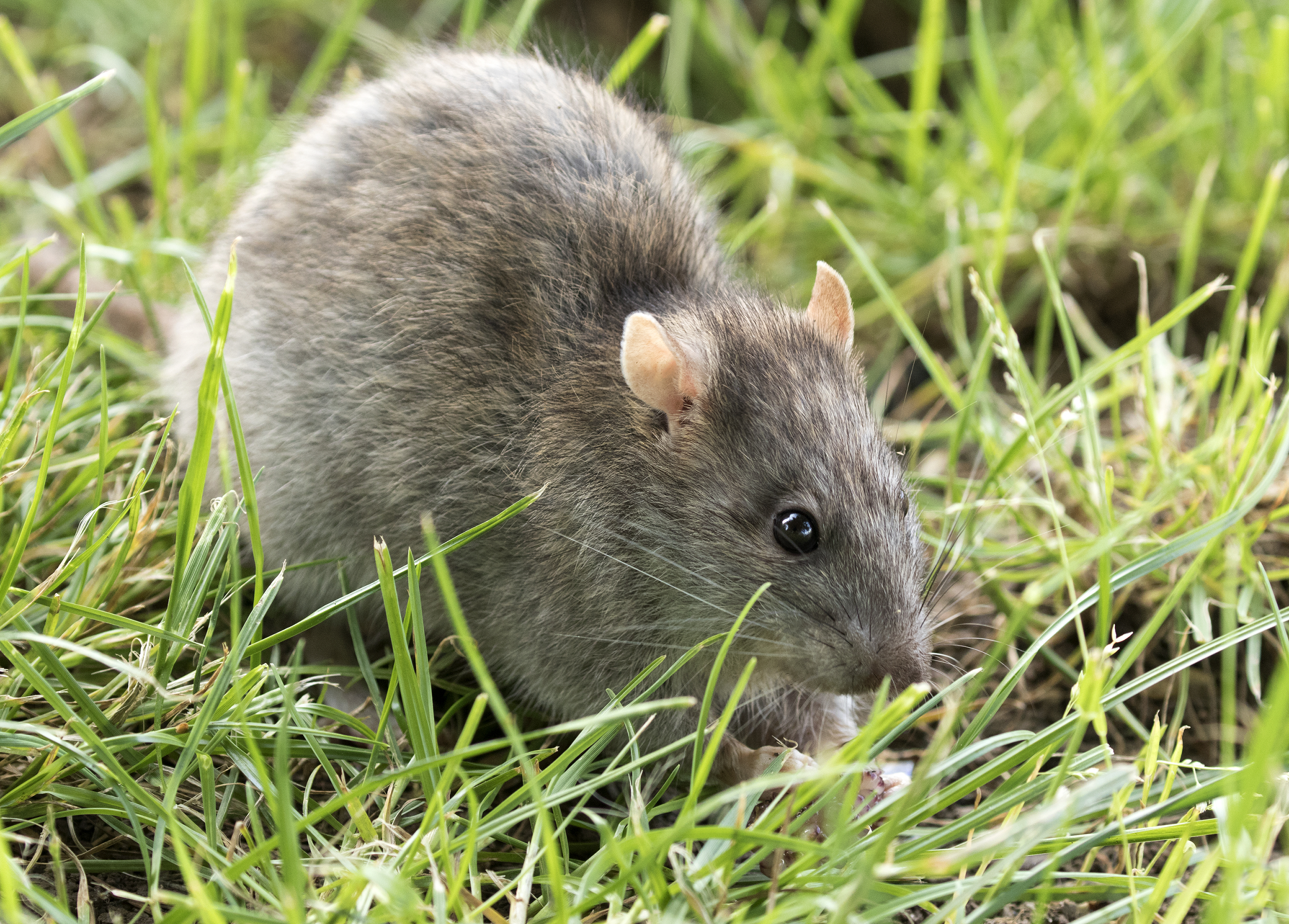
The brown rat, a natural reservoir of Seoul virus.

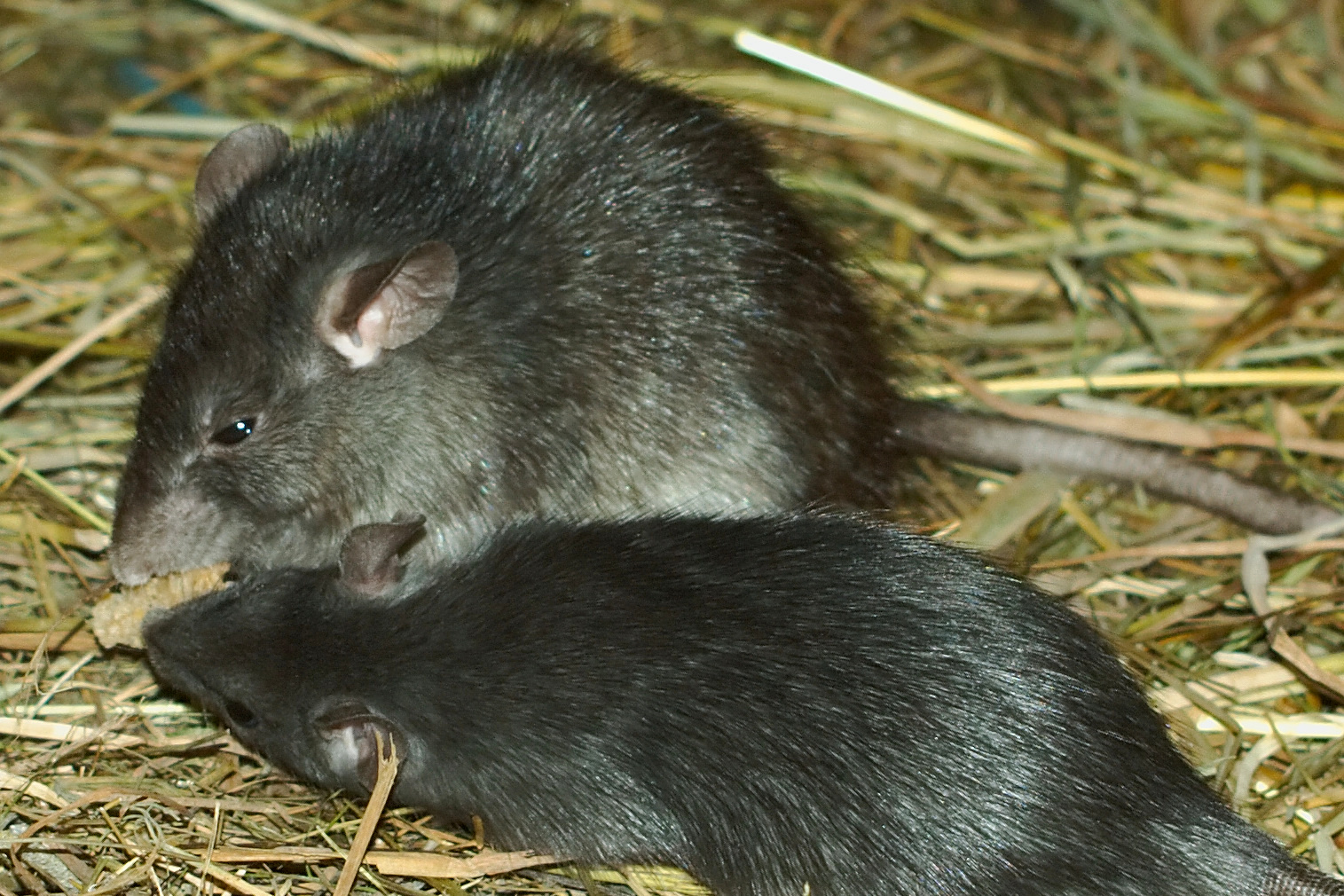
The black rat, a natural reservoir of Seoul virus.

Seoul virus is transmitted by murid brown rats (Rattus norvegicus) and black rats (Rattus rattus). These rats are distributed globally and consequently spread Seoul virus throughout the world. Most cases of HFRS caused by Seoul virus, however, occur in China and South Korea. Pet rats have sometimes been infected and caused HFRS, but this has not been a major public health concern. Strict screening for SEOV, traceability of lab rats, and extermination of infected lab rats have been implemented to ensure that SEOV does not spread in lab rats.

In its rodent hosts, SEOV causes a persistent and mainly asymptomatic infection. Rodent-to-rodent transmission occurs through contact with bodily fluids and through fighting and grooming. Transmission to humans occurs mainly through the inhalation of aerosols that contain rat saliva, urine, or feces. Transmission can also occur through consumption of contaminated food, bites, and scratches. Infections with Seoul virus usually occur in urban settings such as in one's home. While HFRS is primarily associated with the Old World, HFRS caused by SEOV does occasionally occur in the Americas. In one incident in 2016–2017, there was an outbreak of HFRS caused by SEOV in the USA. Seoul virus had spread amongst pet rats, which exposed their owners to the virus.

== Disease ==
Seoul virus infection can cause hemorrhagic fever with renal syndrome (HFRS). Symptoms usually occur 12–16 days after exposure and come in five phases: fever, hypotension, low urine production, high urine production, then recovery. The disease is hallmarked by acute kidney disease with kidney swelling, excess protein in urine, and blood in urine. Early symptoms include fever, headache, lower back pain, nausea, vomiting, diarrhea, bloody stool, and the appearance of spots on the skin. During the hypotensive phase, there is a sudden lowering of blood pressure and shock due to microvascular leakage. Low urine production then occurs as a result of renal failure. As renal function recovers, urine production increases. The case fatality rate from SEOV infection is 1–2%. In addition to standard HFRS symptoms, SEOV infection may cause hepatitis. In more mild cases, the different phases of illness may be hard to distinguish, or some phases may be absent, while in more severe cases, the phases may overlap.

Seoul virus mainly circulates in China and South Korea but is found worldwide due to the global distribution of its hosts. It is responsible for approximately 25% of all HFRS cases in the world. Infections are most common in spring. SEOV infection is diagnosed based on observation of symptoms and testing for hantavirus nucleic acid, proteins, or hantavirus-specific antibodies. Treatment is supportive in nature and includes intravenous hydration, electrolyte therapy, platelet transfusions, and, in cases of kidney injury or failure, intermittent dialysis and continuous renal replacement therapy. Avoiding or minimizing contact with rodents is key to prevent infection. In China and South Korea, bivalent vaccines for Seoul virus and Hantaan virus are available for use. Repeated infections of hantaviruses have not been observed, so recovering from infection likely grants life-long immunity.

== Classification ==
Seoul virus is classified into the species Orthohantavirus seoulense in the genus Orthohantavirus, which is in the family Hantaviridae, the family that all hantaviruses belong to. Other members of Orthohantavirus seoulense include the Gōu virus. The 80-39 isolate of Seoul virus is the exemplar virus of the species. This taxonomy is shown hereafter:

- Family: Hantaviridae
  - Genus: Orthohantavirus
    - Species: Orthohantavirus seoulense
      - Gōu virus
      - Seoul virus

== History ==
The Seoul virus was first isolated in 1980 in South Korea in a brown rat captured in an apartment building in Seoul. This made it the second hantavirus to be discovered after Hantaan virus (HTNV). Initially, no strict distinction was made between Seoul virus and Hantaan virus since SEOV infection caused similar but milder symptoms, so early cases of SEOV infection were often labeled as "HTNV-like" and these cases of HFRS were often called "Rattus-type HFRS". Within just a few years of its discovery, SEOV had been identified in numerous other countries and has since been found throughout the world in five continents: Africa, Asia, Europe, North America, and South America.

From the 1960s to the 1980s, there were a series of HFRS outbreaks in laboratory workers that worked with lab rats, which were thought to be free of rodent viruses. These outbreaks, determined to have been caused by SEOV, were important in understanding the then-novel disease, which was given its official name by the World Health Organization. Seoul virus was accepted as a species by the International Committee on Taxonomy of Viruses in 1987 and has undergone a series of changes to its species name, first changing to Seoul hantavirus, then Seoul orthohantavirus, and most recently to the current Orthohantavirus seoulense. Both the species name and SEOV are named after Seoul, the city where the virus was first discovered.
