= Therese's shrew =

Conservation status
- Least Concern (IUCN 3.1)

Scientific classification
- Kingdom: Animalia
- Phylum: Chordata
- Class: Mammalia
- Order: Eulipotyphla
- Family: Soricidae
- Genus: Crocidura
- Species: C. theresae

Binomial name
- Crocidura theresae Heim de Balsac, 1968
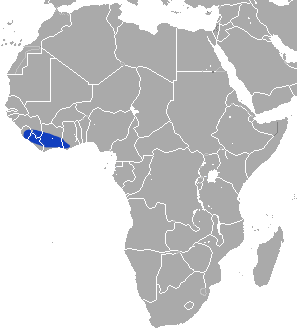
- Therese's shrew range

Species of mammal

Therese's shrew (Crocidura theresae) is a species of mammal in the family Soricidae. It is found in Ivory Coast, Ghana, Guinea, Liberia, and Sierra Leone. Its natural habitats are subtropical or tropical moist lowland forest and moist savanna.
