= Signal peptidase =

Peptidase_S26

Identifiers
- Symbol: Peptidase_S26
- Pfam: PF10502
- Pfam clan: CL0299
- InterPro: IPR019533
- MEROPS: S26
- OPM superfamily: 137
- OPM protein: 1t7d
- Membranome: 323
Available protein structures:
- PDB: IPR019533 PF10502 (ECOD; PDBsum)
- AlphaFold: IPR019533; PF10502

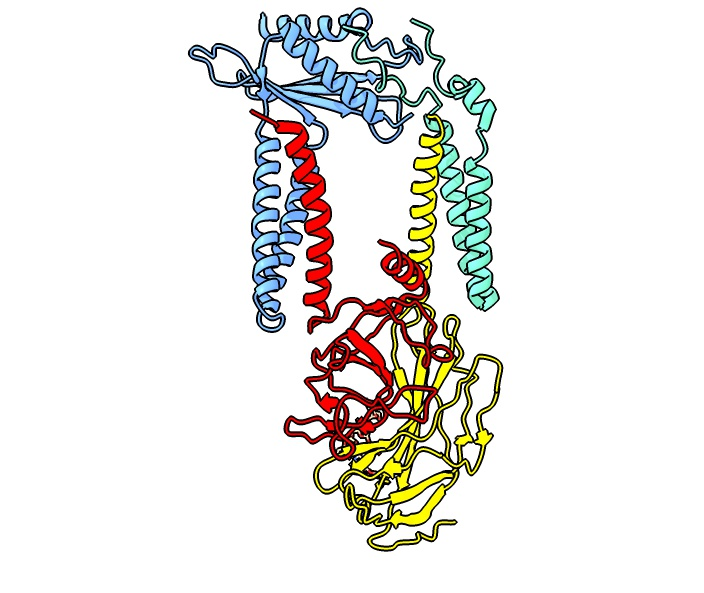
Structure of the human signal peptidase complex (PDB code 7P2P)

Signal peptidase complex subunit 3

Identifiers
- Symbol: SP3
- Pfam: PF04573
- InterPro: IPR007653
- Membranome: 369
Available protein structures:
- PDB: IPR007653 PF04573 (ECOD; PDBsum)
- AlphaFold: IPR007653; PF04573

Signal peptidase I

Identifiers
- EC no.: 3.4.21.89
- CAS no.: 65979-36-4

Databases
- BRENDA: enzyme data
- ExPASy: NiceZyme view
- KEGG: enzyme entry
- MetaCyc: metabolic pathway
- Rhea: reactions
- PDB structures: RCSB PDB PDBe PDBsum
- Gene Ontology: AmiGO / QuickGO
Search
- PMC: articles
- PubMed: articles
- NCBI: proteins

Signal peptidase II

Identifiers
- EC no.: 3.4.23.36
- CAS no.: 171715-14-3

Databases
- BRENDA: enzyme data
- ExPASy: NiceZyme view
- KEGG: enzyme entry
- MetaCyc: metabolic pathway
- Rhea: reactions
- PDB structures: RCSB PDB PDBe PDBsum
- Gene Ontology: AmiGO / QuickGO
Search
- PMC: articles
- PubMed: articles
- NCBI: proteins

Signal peptidases are enzymes that convert secretory and some membrane proteins to their mature or pro forms by cleaving their signal peptides from their N-termini.

Signal peptidases were initially observed in endoplasmic reticulum (ER)-derived membrane fractions isolated from mouse myeloma cells. The key observation by César Milstein and colleagues was that immunoglobulin light chains were produced in a higher molecular weight form, which became processed by the ER membrane fraction. This finding was directly followed by the discovery of the translocation machinery. Signal peptidases are also found in prokaryotes as well as the protein import machinery of mitochondria and chloroplasts.

All signal peptidases described so far are serine proteases. The active site that endoproteolytically cleaves signal peptides from translocated precursor proteins is located at the extracytoplasmic site of the membrane. The eukaryotic signal peptidase is an integral membrane protein complex. The first subunit, which was identified by yeast genetics is Sec11, a 17 kDa membrane protein that is associated with three subunits termed Spc3p (21 kDa), Spc2p (18 kDa) and Spc1p (11 kDa). Sec11 is the only essential factor for signal peptide processing as can be deduced from a growth defect upon its deletion. The functional signal peptidase complex was first purified from a canine ER membrane fraction. The five mammalian subunits, originally named according to their molecular weight are referred to as SPCS1 (SPC12), SEC11A (SPC18), SEC11C (SPC21), SPCS3 (SPC22/23) and SPCS2 (SPC25). These subunits assemble into two distinct paralogous complexes differing in their catalytic subunit SEC11A and SEC11C, respectively, which exhibit largely identical structures. The SPC structure suggests that the enzyme has a transmembrane domain that is only accessible to signal peptides with their characteristically short helical segment.
