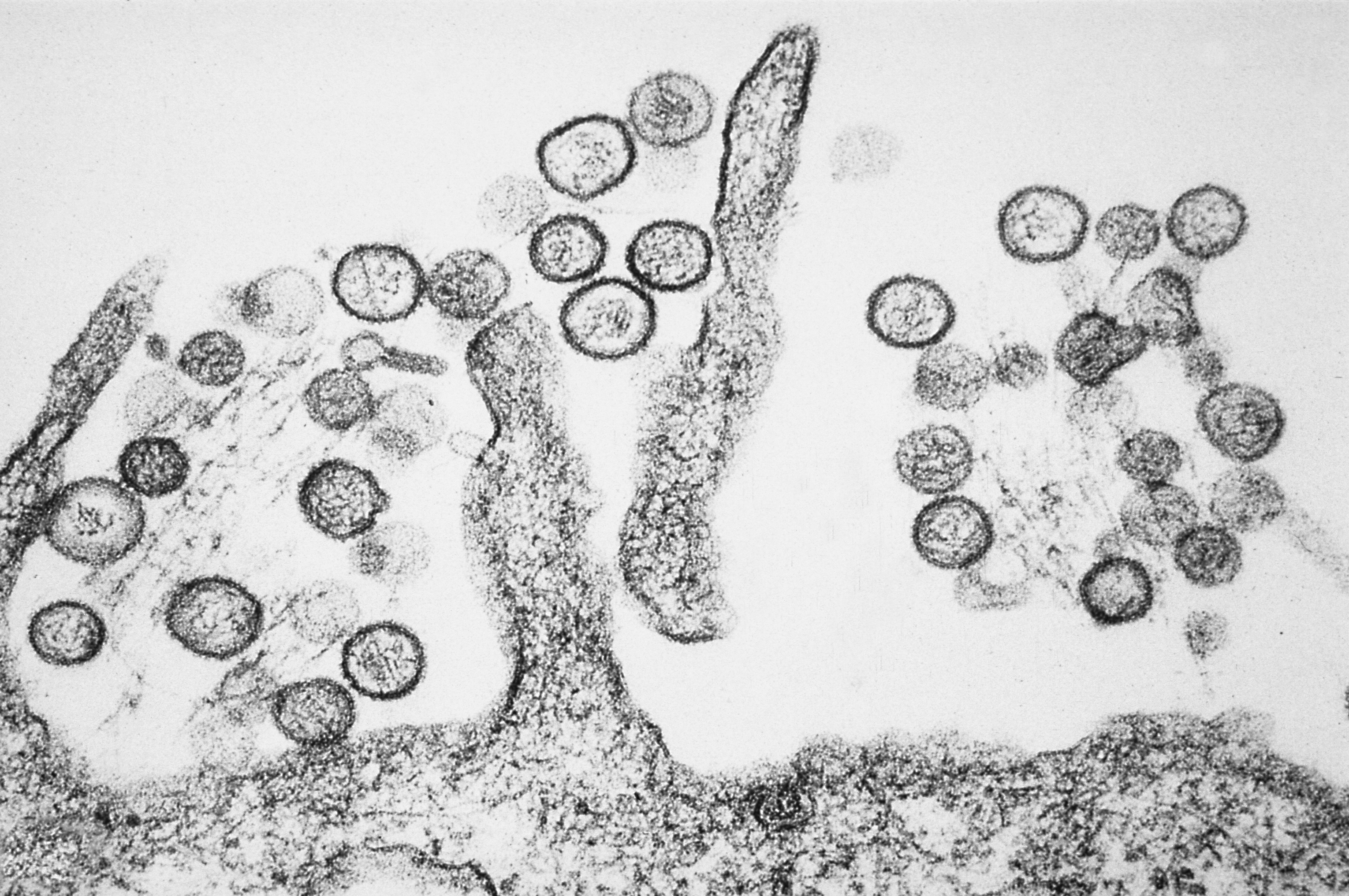
- Transmission electron micrograph of Sin Nombre virus

Virus classification
- (unranked): Virus
- Realm: Riboviria
- Kingdom: Orthornavirae
- Phylum: Negarnaviricota
- Class: Bunyaviricetes
- Order: Elliovirales
- Family: Hantaviridae

Subfamilies and genera
- See text

= Hantaviridae =

Family of viruses

Hantaviridae is a family of negative-sense, single-stranded RNA viruses in the order Elliovirales. Unlike other members of the Bunyavirales, hantaviruses are not spread by biting insects, and instead persistently infect rodent hosts without ill-effect.

It is named for the Hantan River area in South Korea where an early outbreak was observed.

== Impact ==
Hantaviruses are estimated to impact approximately 200,000 people annually worldwide and are responsible for causing two acute febrile illnesses in humans: Hantavirus pulmonary syndrome and hemorrhagic fever with renal syndrome.

There are currently no licensed treatments or vaccinations available for hantavirus, however, multiple drugs have been shown to improve survival rates, including lactoferrin, ribavirin, favipiravir and vandetanib.

Human infection with hantaviruses typically arises from exposure to virus-contaminated aerosols or contact with infected rodents, the natural host of the virus. The only known exception to this is the Andes virus, the only hantavirus where person-to-person transmission has been recorded.

== Taxonomy ==
The family contains the following subfamilies and genera (-virinae denotes subfamily and -virus denotes genus):

- Actantavirinae
  - Actinovirus
  - Percilovirus
- Agantavirinae
  - Agnathovirus
- Mammantavirinae
  - Loanvirus
  - Mobatvirus
  - Orthohantavirus
  - Thottimvirus
- Repantavirinae
  - Reptillovirus

== Hantavirus outbreaks ==
In the past century, there have been two major hantavirus outbreaks: the first was during the Korean War (1950–1953), where 3,000 US troops were affected. The second outbreak was documented in the Four Corners area of the United States in 1993.

Hantaviridae were involved in the 2026 MV Hondius hantavirus outbreak.
