= Elliovirales =

Virus classification
- (unranked): Virus
- Realm: Riboviria
- Kingdom: Orthornavirae
- Phylum: Negarnaviricota
- Class: Bunyaviricetes
- Order: Elliovirales

Order of viruses

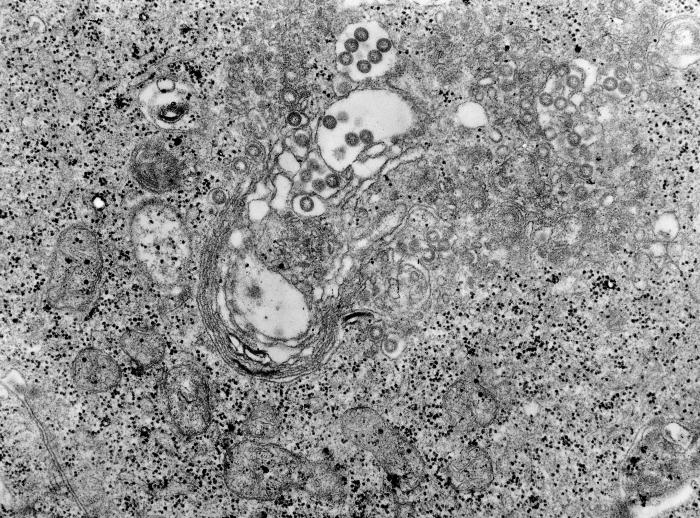
Rift valley fever tissue

Elliovirales is an order of viruses.

== Taxonomy ==
The order contains the following families:

- Cruliviridae
- Fimoviridae
- Hantaviridae
- Peribunyaviridae
- Phasmaviridae
- Tospoviridae
- Tulasviridae
