= Hantavirus hemorrhagic fever with renal syndrome =

Group of clinically similar illnesses caused by species of hantaviruses

Hemorrhagic fever with renal syndrome
- Specialty: Infectious diseases, nephrology
- Symptoms: Headache, lower back pain, nausea, vomiting, diarrhea, bloody stool, petechiae
- Complications: Renal failure
- Causes: Hantaviruses spread by rodents
- Prevention: Rodent control
- Treatment: Supportive, including intravenous hydration, electrolyte therapy, and platelet transfusions
- Medication: None
- Prognosis: Usually good, case fatality rate of <1%–15%

Hantavirus hemorrhagic fever with renal syndrome (HFRS) is a hemorrhagic fever caused by hantavirus infection. Symptoms usually occur 2 weeks after exposure to the hantavirus and come in five distinct clinical stages: febrile (toxic), hypotensive, low urine production (oliguric), high urine production (diuretic), and recovery. Early symptoms include headache, lower back pain, nausea, vomiting, diarrhea, bloody stool, the appearance of spots on the skin, bleeding in the respiratory tract, and renal symptoms such as kidney swelling, proteinuria, and hematuria. During the hypotensive phase, blood pressure lowers due to microvascular leakage. Renal failure then causes the oliguric phase, before recovering and increasing urine production as disease progression improves. The severity of symptoms varies depending on which virus causes HFRS and ranges from mild illness to severe. The case fatality rate likewise varies by virus, from less than 1% up to 15%.

HFRS is caused mainly by four viruses in Asia and Europe: Hantaan virus, Seoul virus, Puumala virus, and Dobrava-Belgrade virus. In East Asia, Hantaan virus is the most common cause of HFRS, causes a severe form of HFRS, and is spread by striped field mice. The Seoul virus accounts for about a quarter of HFRS cases, causes a moderate form of the disease, and is found worldwide due to the global distribution of its natural reservoir, the brown rat. Puumala virus is the most common cause of HFRS in Russia and northern and central Europe, usually causes a mild form of HFRS, and is transmitted by the bank vole. The Dobrava-Belgrade virus is the most common cause of HFRS in southern Europe, and varies in disease severity and natural reservoir depending on its genotype. A mild form of HFRS, often called nephropathia epidemica (NE), is caused by the Puumala virus and Dobrava-Belgrade virus. Transmission occurs mainly through inhalation of aerosols that contain rodent saliva, urine, or feces but can also occur through contaminated food, bites, and scratches. Vascular endothelial cells and macrophages are the primary cells infected by hantaviruses, and infection causes abnormalities with blood clotting, all of which result in fluid leakage responsible for the more severe symptoms. Recovery from infection likely confers lifelong protection.

The main way to prevent HFRS is to avoid or minimize contact with rodents that carry hantaviruses. Removing sources of food for rodents, safely cleaning up after them, and preventing them from entering one's house are all important means of protection. People who are at risk of interacting with infected rodents can wear masks to protect themselves. Bivalent vaccines that protect against Hantaan virus and Seoul virus are in use in China and South Korea. Initial diagnosis of infection can be made based on epidemiological information and symptoms. Confirmation of infection can be done by testing for hantavirus nucleic acid, proteins, or hantavirus-specific antibodies. Treatment of HFRS is supportive and depends on the phase of the disease and clinical presentation. Intravenous hydration, electrolyte therapy, and platelet transfusions may be performed, as well as intermittent hemodialysis for renal failure and continuous renal replacement therapy in critical cases. No specific antiviral drugs exist for hantavirus infection.

More than 100,000 cases of HFRS occur each year. China is the most affected country in Asia, while Finland is the most affected country in Europe. More than 10,000 cases of NE are diagnosed annually. The distribution of viruses that cause HFRS is directly tied to the distribution of their natural reservoirs. Transmission is also greatly influenced by environmental factors such as rainfall, temperature, and humidity, which affect the rodent population and virus transmissibility. Outbreaks of HFRS have occurred throughout history, especially among soldiers during wartime who live in poor conditions. During the Korean War in the 1950s, an epidemic of HFRS occurred among United Nations soldiers stationed near the Hantan river. The outbreak was determined in the 1970s and 1980s to be caused by the Hantaan virus, which was named after the river and which was the first hantavirus discovered. Other HFRS epidemics include an outbreak in Finland in World War Two among German and Finnish soldiers, caused by the Puumala virus, and an outbreak in Croatia during the Balkan Wars, caused by the Puumala virus and the Dobrava-Belgrade virus.

== Signs and symptoms ==
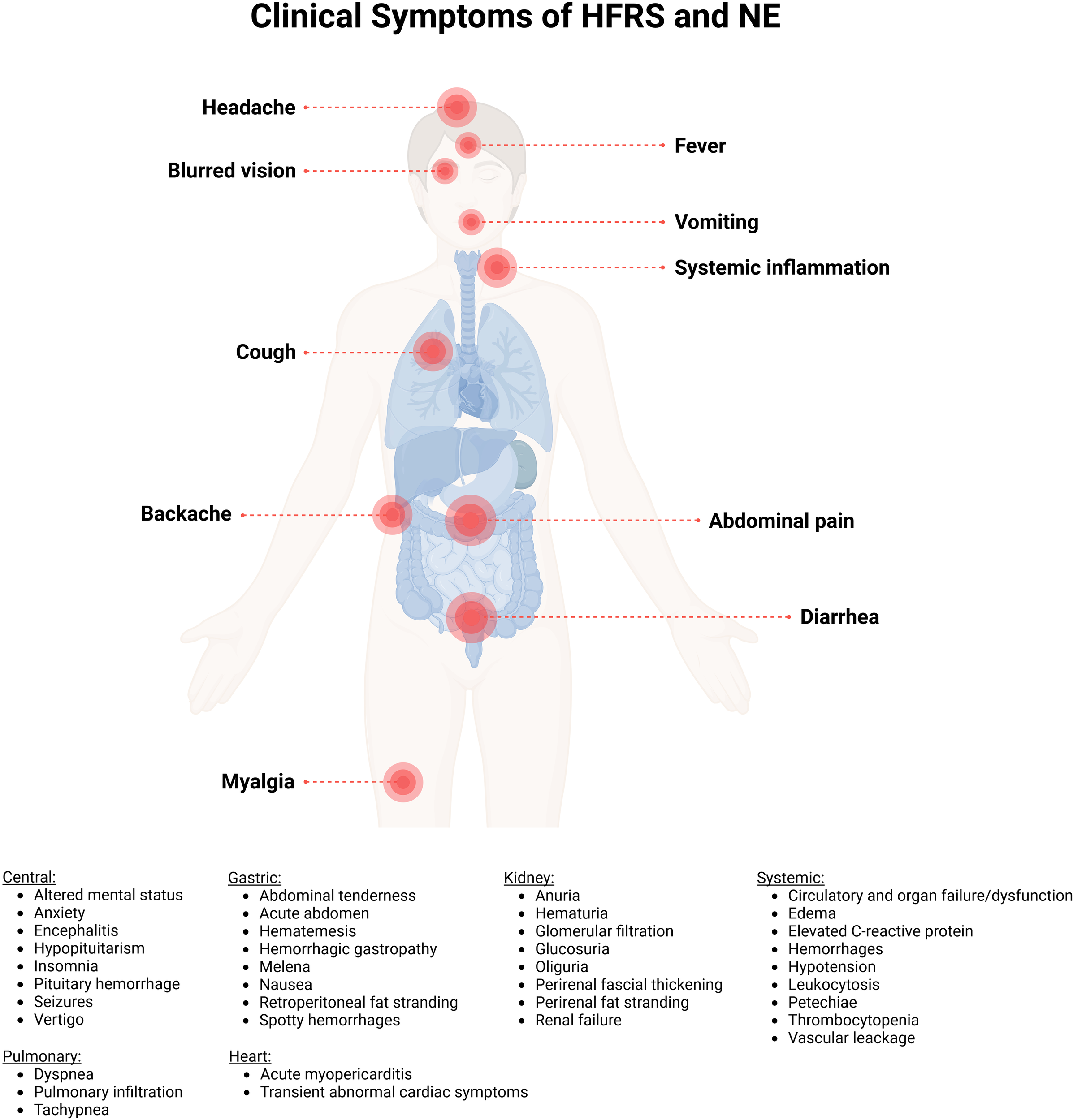
Signs and symptoms of HFRS.

Hantavirus hemorrhagic fever with renal syndrome (HFRS) is characterized by five phases: febrile, hypotensive, low urine production (oliguria), high urine production (polyuria or diuretic), and recovery. Symptoms usually occur 12–16 days after exposure to the virus, but may appear as early as 5 days or as late as 42 days after exposure. A hallmark of HFRS is acute kidney disease with kidney swelling, excess protein in urine (proteinuria), and blood in urine (hematuria). Other symptoms include headache, lower back pain, impaired vision, nausea, vomiting, diarrhea, and bloody stool. These early symptoms last 3–7 days. Hemorrhagic symptoms include the appearance of red, purple, or brown spots on the skin (petechiae) and mucosa within 3–4 days after the onset of symptoms, coughing up blood or blood-stained mucus or airway bleeding (hemoptysis); congestion of the conjunctiva in the eye; gastrointestinal bleeding, and intracranial bleeding. In severe cases, excess blood clotting throughout the body, called disseminated intravascular coagulation (DIC), can occur. The severity of symptoms varies depending on the virus: Hantaan virus causes severe HFRS; Seoul virus, moderate HFRS; Puumala virus, mild HFRS; and Dobrava-Belgrade varies depending on genotype.

During the hypotensive phase, which lasts 1–3 days, there is a sudden onset of lower blood pressure and shock due to microvascular leakage, which can result in sudden death. Urine production and platelet count decrease, white blood cell count in blood increases, and hemorrhaging begins during the hypotensive phase. The oliguric or diuretic phase, which lasts 2–6 days, is caused by renal failure with oliguria and proteinuria. During the polyuria phase, which lasts about 1–2 weeks, renal functions gradually recover, which leads to increased urine production. Complete renal function can be restored after a long recovery process, about 2–6 months, but chronic renal failure, endocrine dysfunction, and hypertension may occur. Extra-renal complications include acute respiratory distress syndrome (ARDS), pituitary gland injury or insufficient pituitary gland hormone production, and inflammation of the gallbladder (cholecystitis), the pericardium (pericarditis), the brain (encephalitis), and the pancreas (pancreatitis).

Infection with Puumala virus or Dobrava-Belgrade virus often causes a mild form of HFRS known as nephropathia epidemica (NE). For pregnant women and fetuses, symptoms are more severe, whereas for children symptoms are milder with greater frequency of abdominal symptoms. Serological surveys suggest that many HFRS infections go unnoticed, either as asymptomatic infections or as a mild flu-like illness with symptoms such as high fever, malaise, and muscle pain. In more mild cases, the different phases of illness may be hard to distinguish, or some phases may be absent, while in more severe cases, the phases may overlap. While HFRS is typically associated with renal disease, symptoms sometimes include cardiopulmonary symptoms associated with hantavirus pulmonary syndrome (HPS). Some symptoms are associated with specific hantaviruses: Puumala virus often causes ocular symptoms such as blurry vision and nearsightedness, Hantaan virus can affect the pituitary gland and cause empty sella syndrome, and Dobrava-Belgrade virus commonly causes ARDS. Repeated infections of hantaviruses have not been observed, so recovering from infection likely grants life-long immunity.

== Virology ==
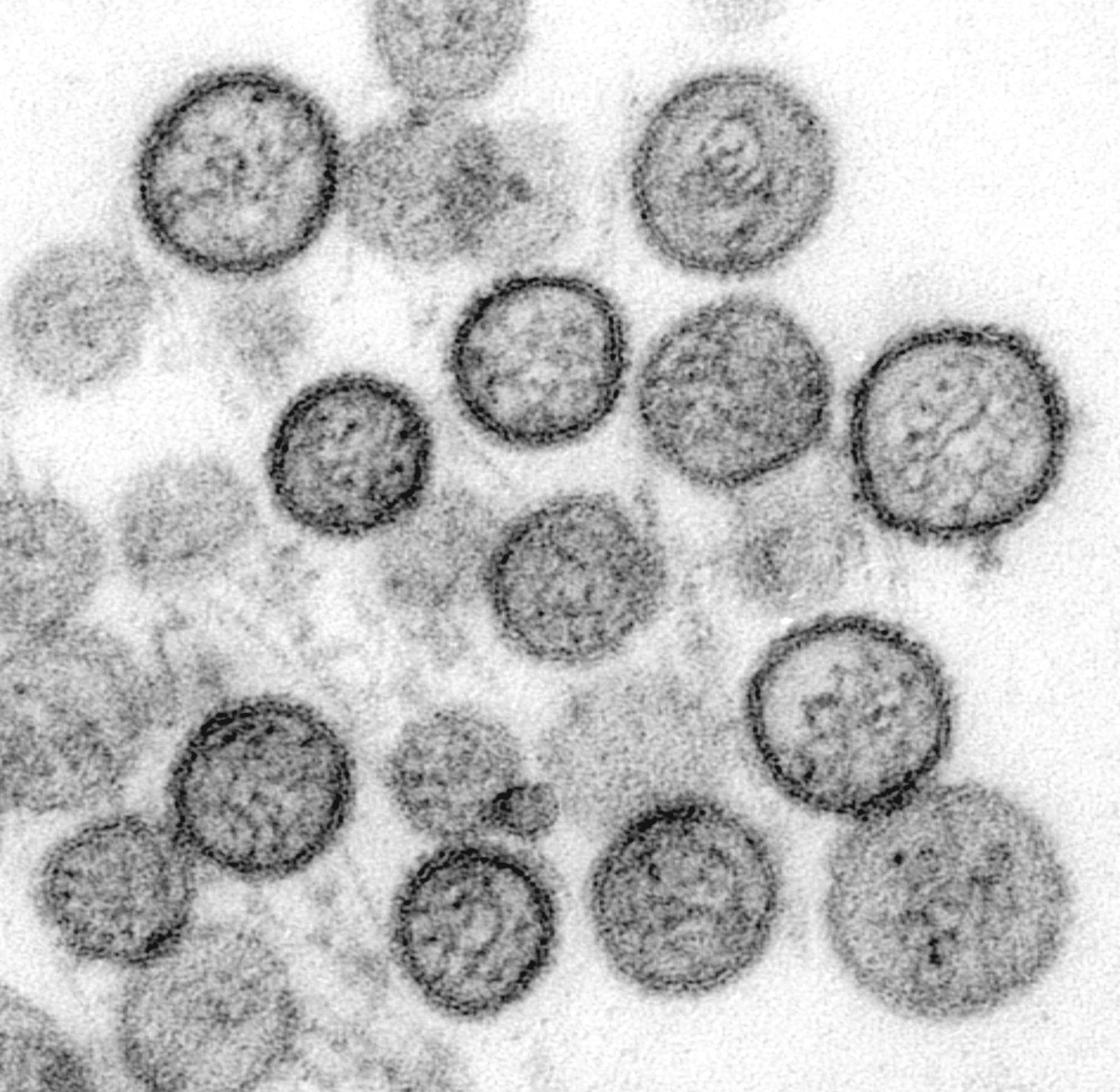
Transmission electron micrograph of Sin Nombre virus, a hantavirus

=== Genome and structure ===
The genome of hantaviruses is segmented into three parts: the large (L), medium (M), and small (S) segments. Each part is a single-stranded negative-sense RNA strand, consisting of 10,000–15,000 nucleotides in total. The segments form into circles via non-covalent bonding of the ends of the genome. The L segment is about 6.6 kilobases (kb) in length and encodes RNA-dependent RNA polymerase (RdRp), which mediates transcription and replication of viral RNA. The M segment, about 3.7 kb in length, encodes a glycoprotein precursor that is co-translated and cleaved into Gn and Gc. Gn and Gc bind to cell receptors, regulate immune responses, and induce protective antibodies. The S segment is around 2.1 kb in length and encodes the N protein, which binds to and protects viral RNA. An open reading frame in the N gene on the S segment of some hantaviruses also encodes the non-structural protein NS that inhibits interferon production in host cells. The untranslated regions at the ends of the genome are highly conserved and participate in the replication and transcription of the genome.

Individual hantavirus particles (virions) are usually spherical, but may be oval, pleomorphic, or tubular. The diameter of the virion is 70–350 nanometers (nm). The lipid envelope is about 5 nm thick. Embedded in the envelope are the surface spike glycoproteins Gn and Gc, which are arranged in a lattice pattern. Each surface spike is composed of a tetramer of Gn and Gc (four units each) that has four-fold rotational symmetry, extending about 10 nm out from the envelope. Gn forms the stalk of the spike and Gc the head. Inside the envelope are helical nucleocapsids made of many copies of the nucleocapsid protein N, which interact with the virus's genome and RdRp. Hantaviruses do not encode matrix proteins to assist with structuring the virion, so how surface proteins organize into a sphere with a symmetrical lattice is not yet known.

=== Life cycle ===
Vascular endothelial cells and macrophages are the primary cells infected by hantaviruses. Podocytes, tubular cells, dendritic cells, and lymphocytes can also be infected. Attachment and entry into the host cell is mediated by the binding of the viral glycoprotein spikes to host cell receptors, particularly β1 and β3 integrins. Decay acceleration factors and complement receptors have also been proposed to be involved in attachment. After attachment, hantaviruses rely on several ways to enter a cell, including micropinocytosis, clathrin-independent receptor-mediated endocytosis and cholesterol- or caveolae-dependent endocytosis. Old World hantaviruses use clathrin-dependent endocytosis while New World hantaviruses use clathrin-independent endocytosis.

After entering a cell, virions form vesicles that are transported to early endosomes, then late endosomes and lysosomal compartments. A decrease in pH then causes the viral envelope to fuse with the endosome or lysosome. This fusion releases viral ribonucleoprotein complexes into the cell cytoplasm, initiating transcription and replication by RdRp. RdRp transcribes viral -ssRNA into complementary positive-sense strands, then snatches 5′ ("five prime") ends of host messenger RNA (mRNA) to prepare mRNA for translation by host ribosomes to produce viral proteins. Complementary RNA strands are also used to produce copies of the genome, which are encapsulated by N proteins to form RNPs.

During virion assembly, the glycoprotein precursor is cleaved in the endoplasmic reticulum into the Gn and Gc glycoproteins by host cell signal peptidases. Gn and Gc are modified by N-glycan chains, which stabilize the spike structure and assist in assembly in the Golgi apparatus for Old World hantaviruses or at the cell membrane for New World hantaviruses. Old World hantaviruses obtain their viral envelope from the Golgi apparatus and are then transported to the cell membrane in vesicles to leave the cell via exocytosis. On the other hand, New World hantavirus RNPs are transported to the cell membrane, where they bud from the cell surface to obtain their envelope and leave the cell.

=== Evolution ===
The most common form of evolution for hantaviruses is mutations through single nucleotide substitutions, insertions, and deletions. Hantaviruses are usually restricted to individual natural reservoir species and evolve alongside their hosts, but this one-species-one-hantavirus relationship is not true for all hantaviruses. The exact evolutionary history of hantaviruses is likely obscured by many instances of genome reassortment, host spillover, and host switching. Because hantaviruses have segmented genomes, they are capable of genetic recombination and reassortment in which segments from different viruses can combine to form new viruses. This occurs often in nature and facilitates the adaptation of hantaviruses to multiple hosts and ecosystems. Within species, geography has also affected the evolution of hantaviruses. For example, Hantaan virus and Seoul virus have both formed multiple lineages corresponding to their geographic distribution.

== Mechanism ==
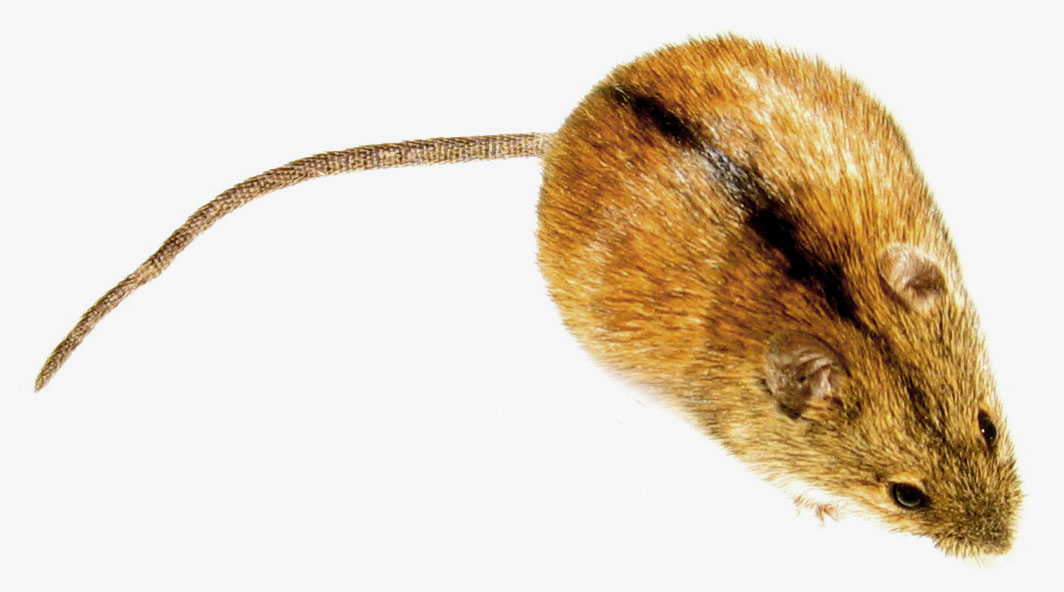
The striped field mouse, the natural reservoir of Hantaan virus and the Dobrava-Belgrade virus genotypes Kurkino virus and Saaremaa virus

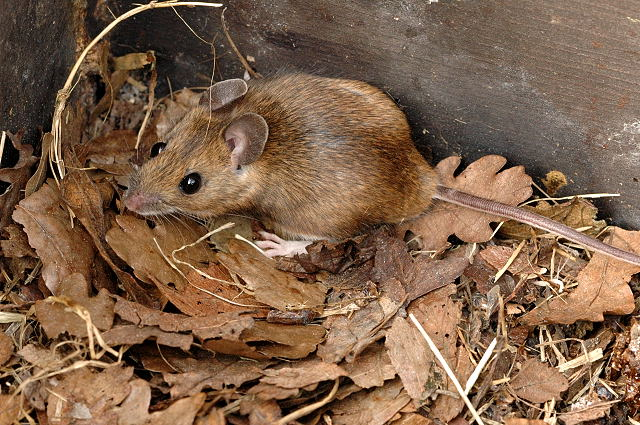
The yellow-necked mouse, the natural reservoir of Dobrava-Belgrade virus genotype Dobrava virus

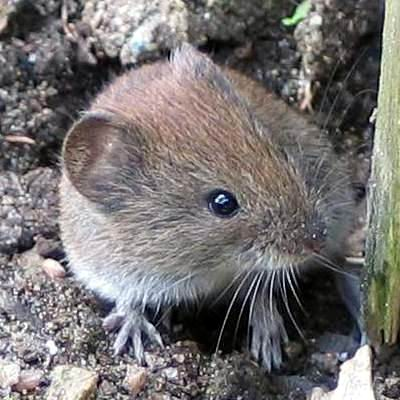
The bank vole, the natural reservoir of Puumala virus

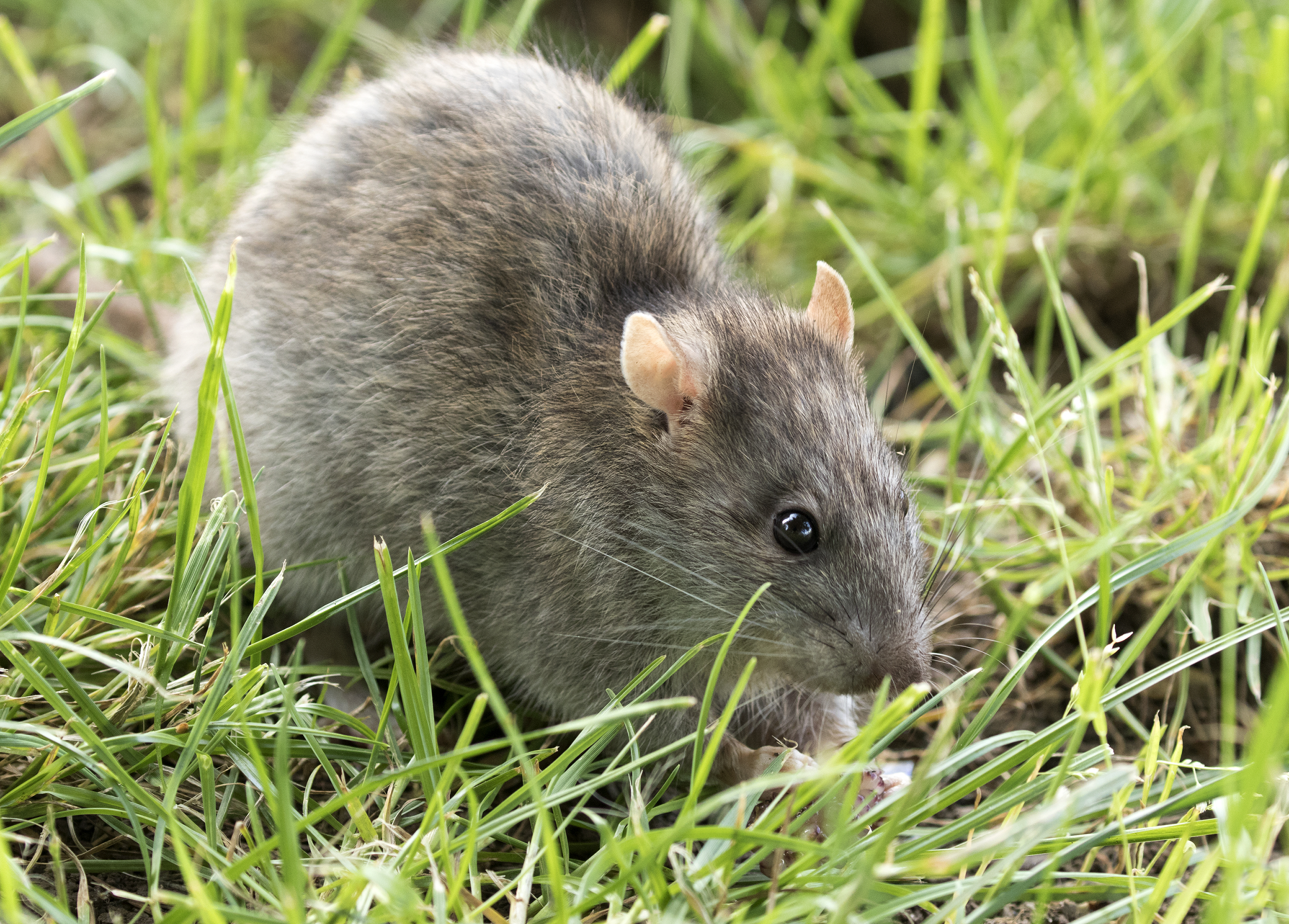
The brown rat, a natural reservoir of Seoul virus

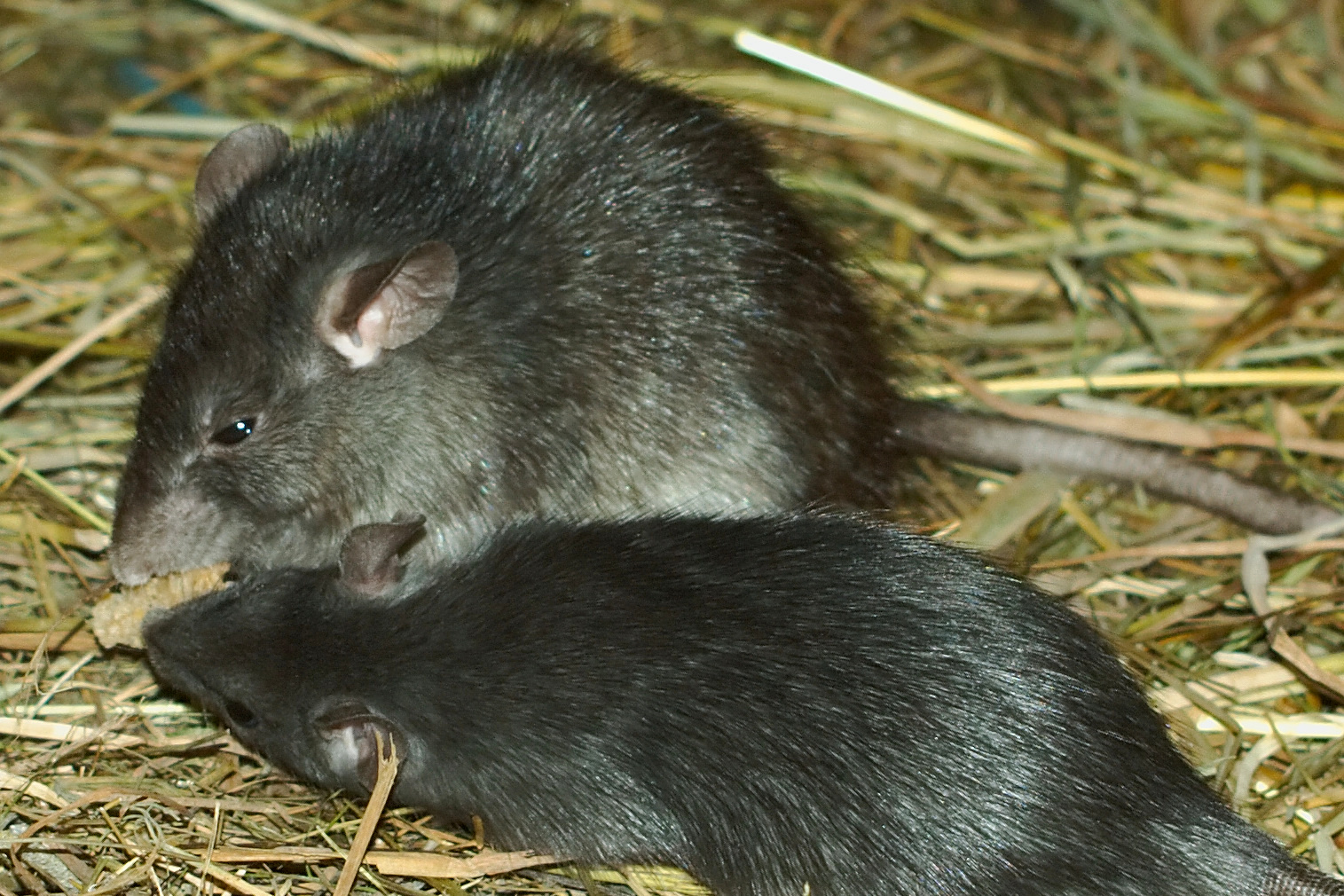
The black rat, a natural reservoir of Seoul virus

=== Transmission ===
Rodents transmit hantaviruses that cause illness in humans. In rodents, hantaviruses usually cause an asymptomatic, persistent infection. Infected animals can spread the virus to uninfected animals through aerosols or droplets from their feces, urine, saliva, and blood, through consumption of contaminated food; from virus particles shed from skin or fur, via grooming, or through biting and scratching. Hantaviruses can also spread through the fecal-oral route and across the placenta during pregnancy from mother to child. They can survive for 10 days at room temperature, 15 days in a temperate environment, and more than 18 days at 4 degrees Celsius, which aids in viral transmission. Environmental conditions favorable to the reproduction and spread of rodents are known to increase disease transmission. Living in a rural environment, in unhygienic settings, and interacting with environments shared with hosts are the biggest risk factors for infection, especially people who are hikers, farmers and forestry workers, as well as those in mining, the military, and zoology.

Rodents can transmit hantaviruses to humans through aerosols or droplets from the excretions and through the consumption of contaminated food. Rodent bites and scratches can also transmit hantaviruses to humans. The prevalence of hantavirus among rodent breeders and rodent pet owners is up to 80%. In one outbreak in North America in 2017, Seoul virus infected 31 people through contact with pet rats. Andes virus has often been claimed by researchers to be the only hantavirus known to be spread from person to person, usually after coming into close contact with an infected person. It can also reportedly spread through human saliva, airborne droplets from coughing and sneezing, and to newborns through breast milk and the placenta. A 2021 systematic review, however, found human-to-human transmission of the Andes virus to be poorly supported by evidence but possible in limited circumstances, especially between close household contacts such as sexual partners. Puumala virus may be transmissible from person to person through blood and platelet transfusions.

Hantaviruses that cause HFRS can be transmitted through the bites of mites and ticks. Research has also shown that pigs can be infected with Hantaan virus without severe symptoms, and sows can transmit the virus to offspring through the placenta. Pig-to-human transmission may also be possible, as one swine breeder was infected with hantavirus with no contact with rodents or mites. Hantaan virus and Puumala virus have been detected in cattle, deer, and rabbits, and antibodies to Seoul virus have been detected in cats and dogs. The role of these hosts for hantaviruses is unknown. Infection in these other animals can potentially facilitate the evolution of hantaviruses by genome reassortment. In addition to rodents, some hantaviruses are found in small insectivorous mammals, such as shrews and bats. Hantavirus antigen has also been detected in a variety of bird species, indicative of infection.

Man-made built environments are important in hantavirus transmission. Deforestation and excessive agriculture may destroy rodents' natural habitat. The expansion of agricultural land is associated with a decline in predator populations, which enables hantavirus host species to use farm monocultures as nesting and foraging sites. Agricultural sites built in proximity to rodents' natural habitats can facilitate the proliferation of rodents, as they may be attracted to animal feed. Sewers and stormwater drainage systems may be inhabited by rodents, especially in areas with poor solid waste management. Maritime trade and travel have also been implicated in the spread of hantaviruses. Research results are inconsistent on whether urban living increases or decreases hantavirus incidence. Seroprevalence, showing past infection with hantavirus, is consistently higher in occupations and areas that have greater exposure to rodents. Poor living conditions on battlefields, in military camps, and in refugee camps make soldiers and refugees at great risk of exposure as well.

=== Pathophysiology ===
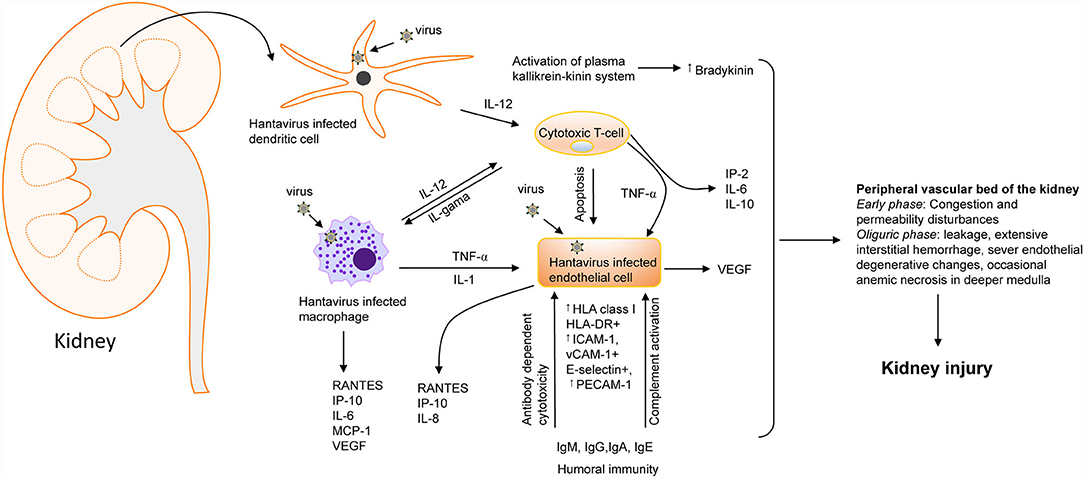
Renal dysfunction as a result of infection.

The main cause of illness is increased vascular permeability, decreased platelet count, and overreaction by the immune system. The increased vascular permeability appears to be the result of infected cells producing vascular endothelial growth factor (VEGF), which activate VEGFR2 receptors on endothelial cells, which increases paracellular permeability. Oxygenation problems and bradykinin are also thought to play a role in increased vascular permeability during infection. Coagulation abnormalities may also occur. Virus particles cluster on the surface of endothelial cells, which causes a misallocation of platelets to infected endothelial cells. Disseminated coagulopathy without signs of hemorrhaging, major blood clots, and damage to vascular endothelial cells during infection may negatively affect coagulation and platelet levels and promote further vascular leaking and hemorrhaging.

Infection begins with the interaction of the viral glycoproteins Gn and Gc and β-integrin receptors on target cell membranes. Immature dendritic cells near endothelial cells transport virions from lymphatic vessels to local lymph nodes to infect more endothelial cells. These cells produce antigens to induce an immune response, especially those of macrophages and CD8+ T lymphocytes. After activation of the immune system, cytotoxic T lymphocytes produce pro-inflammatory cytokines that can damage infected endothelial cells, which can lead to increased vascular permeability and inflammatory reactions. These cytokines include interferon (IFN), interleukins (IL-1, IL-6, and IL-10), and tumor necrosis factor-α (TNF-α). Elevated IL-6 levels are associated with low platelet count and renal failure.

HFRS mainly affects the kidneys and blood vessels, though other parts of the body, such as the nervous system, spleen, and liver, can also be affected. While most major organs become infected, organ failure does not occur in most, as pathology is different from organ to organ. In the tubular epithelium of the kidneys, tight junction proteins are redistributed, and tubular necrosis occurs, which impairs the kidney tubules and causes proteinuria and hematuria. Glomerular endothelium infection in the kidneys causes decreased function of glomerular ZO-1 expression, which reduces the function of the glomerulus as a molecular filter by increasing glomerular permeability, which causes proteinuria and hematuria. Liver infection does not lead to significant dysfunction since hepatic blood vessels are already relatively permeable. In the spleen, infection of immune cells can cause over-activation of immature lymphocytes elsewhere and facilitate prolonged spread of the virus throughout the body.

=== Immunology ===
The innate immune system recognizes hantavirus infection by the detection of viral RNA. This triggers production of interferons, immune cytokines, and chemokines and activation of signaling pathways to respond to viral infection. Monocytes respond to infection by using phagocytosis to consume virus particles. IgM antibodies to the viral surface glycoproteins are created to bind to and disable virus particles. During infection, the anti-Gc IgM response is stronger than the anti-Gn IgM response. Long term, the anti-Gc IgG response is stronger than the anti-Gn IgG response. Anti-N antibodies are produced during infection but are not involved in neutralizing virions. Long non-coding RNA and microRNA are involved in inhibiting hantavirus infection.

Pathogenic hantaviruses can modify the immune response and evade interferon-mediated antiviral signaling pathways in various ways, including by inhibiting interferon activation, inhibiting the activation of transcription factors, and inhibiting downstream JAK/STAT signaling. They can also regulate cell death to aid in completing their life cycle through autophagy, apoptosis, and pyroptosis. Hantaan virus infection and NP and GP protein expression have been shown to promote the production of microRNAs that reduce the expression of pro-inflammatory cytokines. Furthermore, hantaviruses appear to induce cell stress via endoplasmic reticulum stress while inhibiting the cellular response to stress, which helps the virus escape host stress signaling.

== Prevention ==
Reducing the risk of exposure to rodents at home, one's workplace, and when camping prevents hantavirus infection. Rodent control methods such as rodenticides, traps, and cats have been proposed as ways to control the rodent population. Cleaning and disinfecting human living spaces by removing rodent food sources can prevent the contamination of food and other items with hantaviruses from rodent excretions and secretions. Preventing rodents from entering one's house, removing potential nesting sites around one's house, sweeping areas likely inhabited by rodents, covering trash cans, cutting grass, spraying water to prevent dust before activities, and installing public warning signs in endemic areas can help to reduce contact with rodents.

People at high risk of infection, including pest exterminators, people who work in agriculture, forestry, and animal husbandry, can take preventive measures such as wearing masks to prevent exposure to hantaviruses. In high risk groups, vaccines may be necessary. Ventilation of rooms before entering, using rubber gloves and disinfectants, and using respirators to avoid inhaling contaminated particles while cleaning up rodent-infested areas reduce the risk of hantavirus infections. Hantaviruses can be inactivated by heating at 60 degrees Celsius for 30 minutes, or with organic solvents, hypochlorite solvents, and ultraviolet light.

Vaccines against hantavirus infection have been approved in South Korea and China. In South Korea, an inactivated whole virus vaccine called Hantavax has been marketed since 1990 to protect against HFRS caused by Hantaan virus and Seoul virus. The vaccine has not shown to prevent infection but is associated with reduced disease severity. Due to a diminishing vaccine-induced antibody response, frequent booster doses are required. A similar vaccine was approved for use in China in 2005, which provides immunity for up to 33 months. Other vaccines have been researched in animal models such as recombinant vaccines, DNA vaccines, virus-like particle (VLP) vaccines, recombinant vector vaccines, and subunit vaccines. These vaccines have shown varying degrees of effectiveness.

== Diagnosis ==
Initial diagnosis of hantavirus infection can be made based on epidemiological information and clinical symptoms. Confirmation of infection also includes detection of hantavirus nucleic acid, proteins, or hantavirus-specific antibodies. Key findings of laboratory findings include thrombocytopenia, leukocytosis, hemoconcentration, elevated serum creatinine levels, hematuria, and proteinuria. Hantavirus-specific IgM and IgG antibodies are usually present at the onset of symptoms. IgM is detectable in the acute phase of infection but declines over a period of 2–6 months. The response of IgG antibodies is low during infection but grows over time and lasts for one's lifetime.

Neutralization tests, immunofluorescent assays (IFAs), and enzyme-linked immunosorbent assays (ELISAs) can be used to detect antibodies to hantavirus infection in blood, usually anti-N or anti-Gc antibodies. ELISA is inexpensive and can be used at any point during the illness, but results may need to be confirmed by other methods. Rapid immunochromatographic IgM antibody tests can also be used for diagnosis as they are simple to carry out and inexpensive. Western blotting can detect hantavirus antigen in tissue samples, but is costly and time consuming.

Both traditional and real-time polymerase chain reaction (PCR) tests of blood, saliva, BAL fluids, and tissue samples can be used. There is a possibility of false negatives with PCR if there are low levels of virus in the blood, and PCR testing is prone to cross-contamination, but when performed during the onset of infection, it may predict disease severity. PCR can also be used for postmortem diagnosis and for analysis of organ involvement, and it can be used to sequence the virus's genome to identify which specific virus is causing illness.

== Management ==
Treatment of HFRS is supportive in nature. The specific form of treatment depends on the phase of the disease and clinical presentation. Intravenous hydration and electrolyte therapy are essential to maintain blood pressure and electrolyte balance. Platelet transfusions can be used to reduce mortality in cases of severe thrombocytopenia and disseminated intravascular coagulation to control bleeding. If acute kidney injury occurs, then intermittent hemodialysis is used as the first option, and continuous renal replacement therapy in critical HFRS cases. No specific antiviral drugs exist for hantavirus infection, but ribavirin and favipiravir have shown varying efficacy and safety.

Prophylactic use of ribavirin and favipiravir in early infection or post-exposure shows some efficacy, and both have shown some anti-hantavirus activity in vivo and in vitro. Ribavirin is effective in the early treatment of HFRS with some limitations, such as toxicity at high doses and the potential to cause hemolytic anemia. Anemia is reversible upon completion of ribavirin treatment. In some instances, ribavirin may cause excess bilirubin in the blood (hyperbilirubinemia), abnormally slow heartbeat (sinus bradycardia), and rashes. Administering ribavirin after the onset of the cardiopulmonary phase of HPS is not an effective treatment, and currently there is no recommendation for the use of ribavirin to treat HFRS or HPS.

Favipiravir has greater efficacy than ribavirin, without anemia as a side effect. In hamster models, oral administration of favipiravir twice per day of 100 mg/kg significantly reduced viral load in the blood and antigen load in the lungs. Oral administration before viremia prevented HPS, but not after this. Several other approaches have been researched as potential anti-hantavirus treatments, including small-molecule compounds that target the virus or host, peptides, alligator weed, antibodies, and classical antiviral drugs, tested mainly to block hantavirus entry into cells or restrain virus replication. Host-targeting medicines are designed to improve vascular function or rebuild homeostasis.

== Prognosis ==
Prognosis is good in most cases. The case fatality rate ranges from less than 1% to 15%, depending on the virus and location. In China, where most cases are caused by Hantaan virus and Seoul virus, the case fatality rate is about 2.89%. In South Korea, the case fatality rate is 1–2%. The global case fatality rate for the Seoul virus is around 1%. Pathogenicity of Dobrava-Belgrade virus varies by genotype: infection with the deadlier genotypes results in death for 10–15% of the infected, while for the milder genotypes, the case fatality rate is 0.3–0.9%. Puumala virus infection has a case fatality rate of 0.1–0.4%. Post-infection Guillain–Barré Syndrome has been reported on rare occasions, indicated by acute limb weakness. Weakness and fatigue are common during recovery.

People who are over 60 years of age are at an increased likelihood of death, as are tobacco smokers, people who have diabetes, or high blood pressure (hypertension). Deaths typically involve the development of severe complications, and death is more common among those who experience septic shock, ARDS, heart failure, irregular heartbeat, and pancreatitis. Death is also associated with lower platelet count, elevated white blood cell count, and higher aspartate aminotransferase and alanine aminotransferase.

The antibody response to hantavirus infection is strong and long-lasting. Early production of neutralizing antibodies (nAbs) that target the surface glycoproteins is directly associated with increased likelihood of survival. High nAb counts can be detected as long as ten years after infection. Higher levels of IL-6, in contrast, are associated with more severe disease, and deceased individuals have higher IL-6 levels than survivors. Genetic susceptibility to severe illness is related to one's human leukocyte antigen (HLA) type, which also depends on the hantavirus, as increased susceptibility to different hantaviruses is associated with different HLA haplogroups.

== Epidemiology ==
Most cases of HFRS are caused by just four viruses: Hantaan virus, Seoul virus, Puumala virus, and Dobrava-Belgrade virus. The geographic distribution of individual hantaviruses is directly tied to the geographic distribution of their natural reservoir. Seoul virus is found worldwide due to the global distribution of its hosts, the brown rat, but mainly circulates in China and South Korea and accounts for about a quarter of all HFRS cases. In Europe, Dobrava-Belgrade virus and Puumala virus spread, the latter of which is more common. Infections in Europe are most common in Germany, Finland, and Russia. The number of cases in Europe has gradually increased over time. In China and Korea, the number of cases has declined significantly.

More than 100,000 cases of HFRS are reported each year. From 1950 to 2007, more than 1.5 million cases and more than 45,000 deaths were recorded in China, where 70–90% of HFRS cases are reported, most of which are caused by Hantaan virus and Seoul virus. These cases are distributed throughout China but are more common in the east, and spike during winter and spring. Since 2010, HFRS incidence in China has declined significantly, from 0.99 per 100,000 population in 2010 to 0.31 per 100,000 in 2024, while the case fatality rate fell from 1.27% to 0.28% over the same period. In South Korea, 400–600 cases occur each year. Finland is the most affected country in Europe, with 1,000–3,000 cases every year. More than 10,000 cases of NE are diagnosed annually. Infection is more common in men.

=== Environment ===
Rodent species that carry hantaviruses inhabit a diverse range of habitats, including desert-like biomes, equatorial and tropical forests, swamps, savannas, fields, and salt marshes. The seroprevalence of hantaviruses in their host species has been observed to range from 5.9% to 38% in the Americas, and 3% to about 19% worldwide, depending on testing method and location. In some places, such as South Korea, routine trapping of wild rodents is performed to surveil hantavirus circulation. High humidity can benefit rodent populations in warm climates, where it may positively impact plant growth and thus food availability. Increased forest coverage is associated with increased hantavirus incidence, particularly in Europe.

Rainfall is consistently associated with hantavirus incidence patterns. Heavy rainfall is a risk factor for outbreaks in the following months, but may negatively affect incidence by flooding rodent burrows and nests. Infections are more common in the wet season than the dry season. Low rainfall and drought are associated with decreased incidence since such conditions result in a smaller rodent population, but displacement of rodent populations via drought or flood can lead to an increase in rodent-human interactions and infections. In Europe, however, no association between rainfall and incidence has been observed.

Temperature has varying effects on hantavirus transmission. Higher temperatures create unfavorable environments for virus survival, but it can cause rodents to seek shelter from heat in human settings and are beneficial for aerosol production. Lower temperature can prolong virus survival outside a host. Higher average winter temperature is associated with reduced survival of bank voles, the natural reservoir of Puumala virus, but increased survival of striped field mice in China, the natural reservoirs of Hantaan virus. Extreme temperatures, whether hot or cold, are associated with lower disease incidence.

== History ==
Hantavirus hemorrhagic disease was likely first described in the Yellow Emperor's Internal Canon in Imperial China during the Warring States Period of 475–221 BCE. Hantaviruses have been suggested as a cause of "trench nephritis" in soldiers during the US Civil War and in British soldiers in Flanders, Belgium during the First World War. The disease was also mentioned in East Asia, where it was probably endemic, and was first described scientifically in Vladivostok in 1913–1914. During the Second World War in 1942, an outbreak of disease with symptoms characteristic of hantavirus infection occurred in Salla, Eastern Lapland, Finland, among German and Finnish soldiers. This outbreak was later reported in 1980 to be caused by a virus transmitted by bank voles and was named Puumala virus. Also during the war, around 10,000 Japanese soldiers stationed in Manchuria developed HFRS.

HFRS was common amongst United Nations soldiers stationed near the Hantan river during the Korean War, where it was first identified in 1951 and named "Korean hemorrhagic fever" and "epidemic hemorrhagic fever". About 3,200 cases occurred from 1951 to 1954. After the war, in 1976 in South Korea, trapped striped field mice were tested, and antigens in their lungs were shown to react to antibodies in sera from survivors of Korean hemorrhagic fever. A specific agent could not be isolated in cell cultures, but the disease was shown to be caused by an infectious agent, and other known causes of hemorrhagic fever were ruled out. In 1978, the virus was isolated for the first time from the lung tissue of a striped field mouse and named Hantaan virus. Retrospective analysis on sera from war veterans later confirmed that Hantaan virus was responsible for the epidemic during the Korean War.

The first successful culturing of the virus was in 1981, in which a hantavirus extracted from naturally infected rodents trapped near Songnaeri, South Korea, was transmitted through mice with no history of infection four times. Originally named "KHF strain 76-118", it was renamed to "Hantaan virus, strain 76-118" after the Hantan River and is now commonly called Hantaan virus. Initially thought to be related to arenaviruses, which are also transmitted by rodents, analysis of the structure of hantaviruses suggested it instead belonged to the bunyavirus family, which previously were only known to be transmitted by arthropods. By 1980, studies confirmed that other viruses related to Hantaan virus caused long-known diseases throughout Eurasia. These diseases had a variety of names, so in 1982, the World Health Organization agreed to name the disease "hemorrhagic fever with renal syndrome (HFRS)". Further analysis of Hantaan virus showed that it possessed the characteristics of bunyaviruses but did not serologically cross-react with other known bunyaviruses, so a new genus, Hantavirus, was proposed to accommodate Hantaan virus and related viruses. In 1985, this group of viruses were given the name "hantaviruses", and in 1987, the genus was recognized by International Committee on Taxonomy of Viruses.

== See also ==
- Hantavirus pulmonary syndrome
- 1993 Four Corners hantavirus outbreak
- 2012 Yosemite hantavirus outbreak
- MV Hondius hantavirus outbreak
