= Hantavirus vaccine =

Vaccine against hantavirus infections

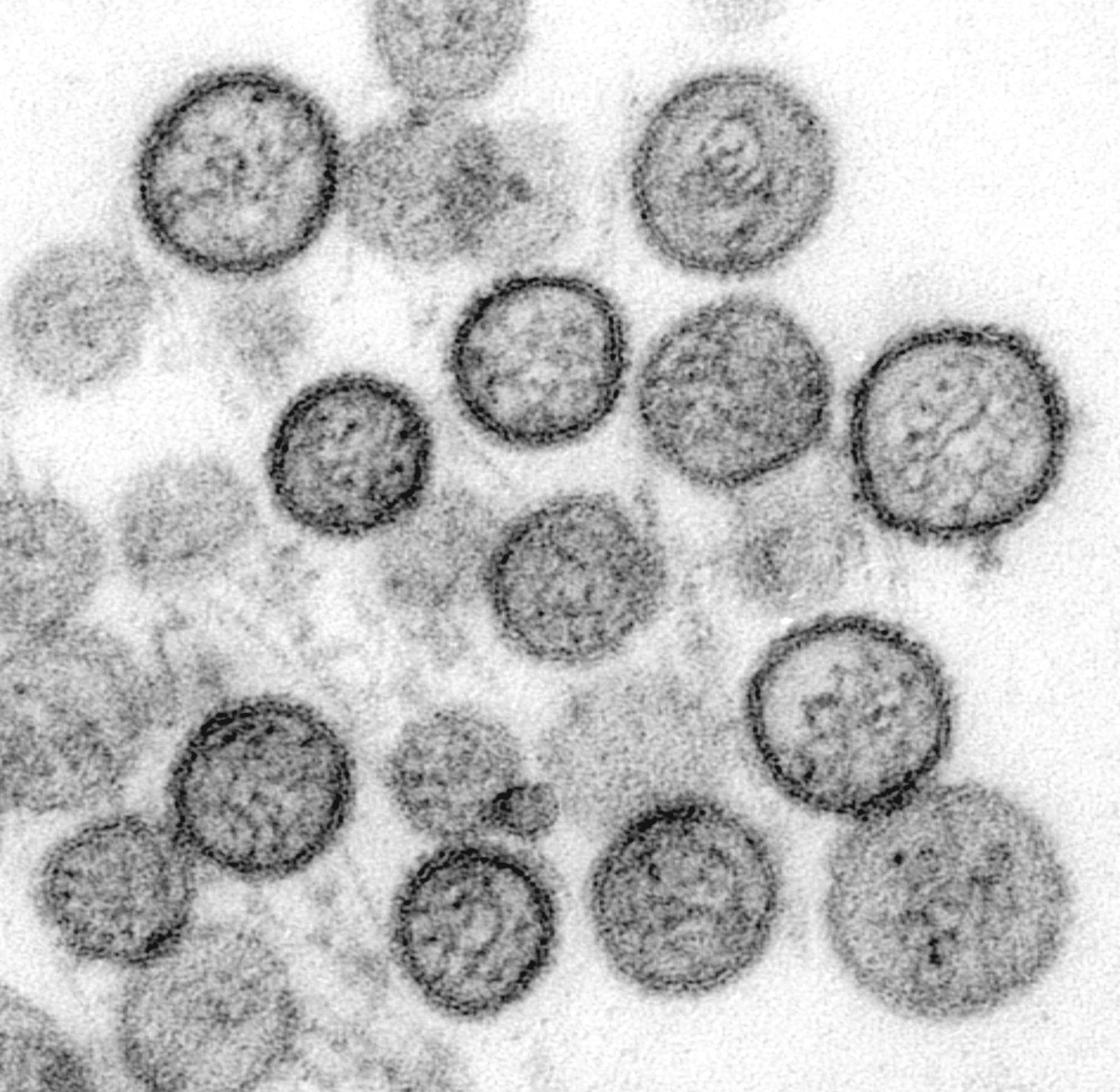
Transmission electron micrograph of hantavirus by CDC

Hantavirus vaccine, sold under the brand name Hantavax, is a vaccine that protects in humans against hantavirus hemorrhagic fever with renal syndrome (HFRS) or hantavirus pulmonary syndrome (HPS). The vaccine is considered important as acute hantavirus infections are responsible for significant morbidity and mortality worldwide. It is estimated that about 1.5 million cases and 46,000 deaths occurred in China from 1950 to 2007. The number of cases is estimated at 32,000 in Finland from 2005 to 2010 and 90,000 in Russia from 1996 to 2006.

== History ==
The first hantavirus vaccine was developed in 1990 initially for use against Hantaan River virus which causes one of the most severe forms of HFRS. It is estimated that about two million doses of rodent brain or cell-culture derived vaccine are given in China every year. The wide use of this vaccine may be partly responsible for a significant decrease in the number of HFRS cases in China to less than 20,000 by 2007.

Other hantaviruses for which the vaccine is used include Seoul (SEOV) virus. However the vaccine is thought not to be effective against European hantaviruses including Puumala (PUUV) and Dobrava-Belgrade (DOBV) viruses. As of 2019 no hantavirus vaccine had been approved for use in Europe or USA. A phase 2 study on a human HTNV/PUUV DNA hantavirus vaccine is ongoing.

Three more vaccine candidates have been studied in I–II stage clinical trials. They include a recombinant vaccine and vaccines derived from HTNV and PUUV viruses. However, their prospects are unclear.

In 2026, scientists at the University of Bath were reported to be working on a hantavirus vaccine against the Hantaan virus strain.

== See also ==
- Gou virus
- List of vaccine topics
- Seoul virus
- Vaccine-naive
