= Hantavirus infection =

- Other names: Hantavirus disease
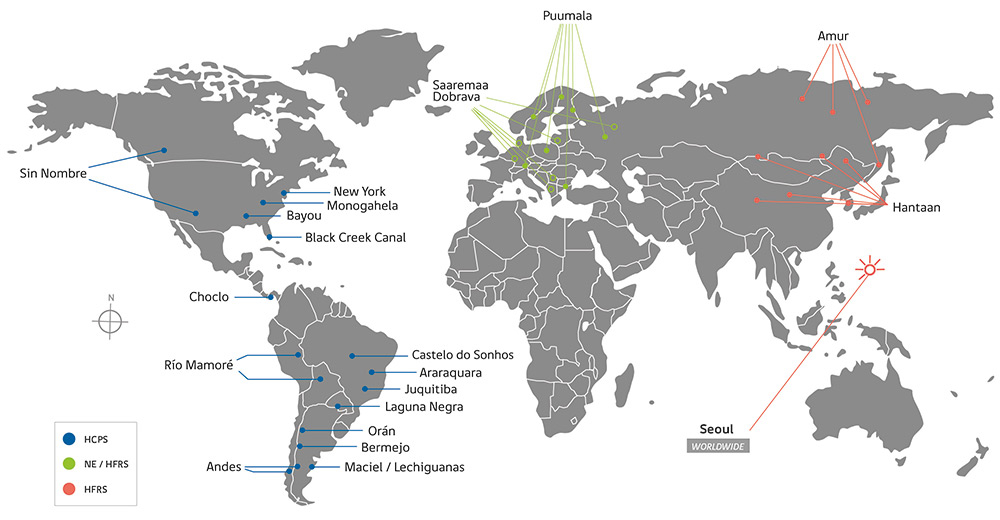
- World distribution of disease causing hantaviruses. HCPS NE/HFRS HFRS
- Specialty: Infectious disease
- Symptoms: HFRS: Headache, abdominal pain, fever, nausea, bleeding, kidney failure HPS: Tiredness, fever, muscle pain, cough, shortness of breath
- Usual onset: 1 to 8 weeks following exposure
- Types: Hemorrhagic fever with renal syndrome (HFRS); Hantavirus pulmonary syndrome (HPS)
- Causes: orthohantaviruses spread by rodents
- Diagnostic method: Blood tests
- Prevention: Rodent control
- Treatment: Supportive care
- Frequency: HFRS 100,000 cases per year, HPS < 50 cases per year
- Deaths: HFRS 12%, HPS 40%
- Named after: Hantan River in South Korea

Hantavirus infection or hantavirus disease is an infectious disease of humans caused by viruses in the Orthohantavirus genus of viruses. It can result in hemorrhagic fever with renal syndrome (HFRS) or hantavirus pulmonary syndrome (HPS). Symptoms of HFRS generally include headache, abdominal pain, fever, nausea, bleeding, and kidney failure. Symptoms of HPS include tiredness, fever, muscle pain, cough, and shortness of breath. Onset of initial symptoms is generally 1 to 8 weeks following exposure.

HFRS is due to Old World hantaviruses while HPS is due to New World hantaviruses. More than 28 specific hantaviruses cause disease in humans. The disease is typically spread when people breathe in air contaminated by rodent droppings. The underlying mechanism of both forms of the disease involves low platelets and leaky blood vessels. Diagnosis is based on blood tests, typically serology.

Treatment is primarily supportive care. This may include oxygen therapy, mechanical ventilation, dialysis, or platelet transfusions. Ribavirin may be useful if given early in HFRS. The risk of death is around 12% with HFRS and around 40% with HPS.

About 100,000 cases of HFRS occur a year, while about 1,000 cases of HPS have been identified since it was first detected in 1993. While descriptions of what is believed to be hantavirus infections date back to around 1000 AD, the virus that causes the disease was not discovered until 1976, in the Hantan River area of South Korea.

In April 2026, an outbreak of hantavirus infection caused by the Andes virus was identified on the Dutch cruise ship MV Hondius.

== Signs and symptoms ==
=== Initial symptoms ===
After an incubation period of 2–4 weeks, the typical illness for all hantaviruses starts with non-specific symptoms which may include high fever, chills, headache, backache, abdominal pains, nausea, and vomiting.

=== Hemorrhagic fever with renal syndrome ===
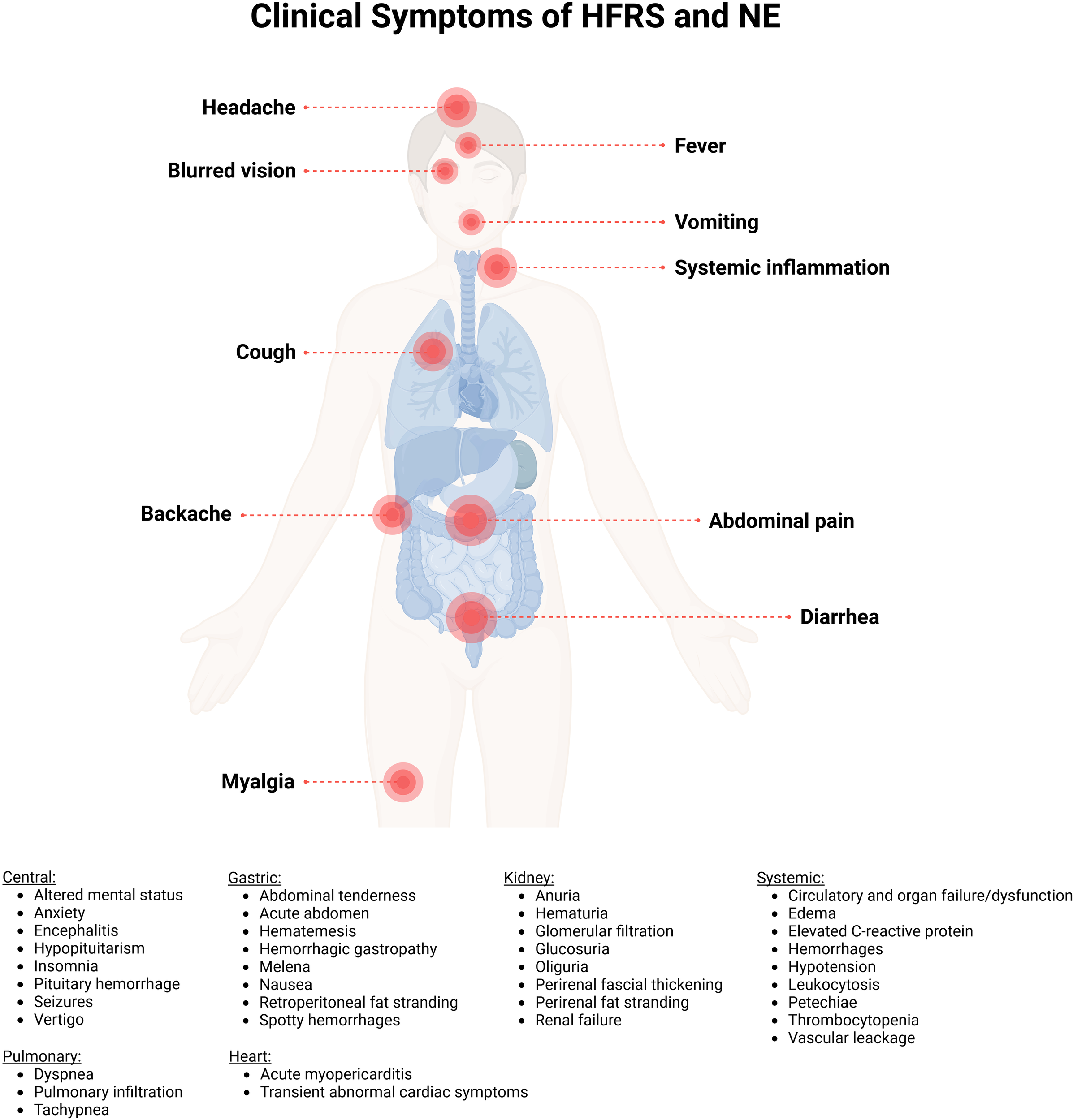
Symptoms of hemorrhagic fever with renal syndrome and nephropathia epidemica

Hemorrhagic fever with renal syndrome (HFRS) is caused chiefly by hantaviruses in Asia and Europe. Clinical presentation varies from subclinical to fatal, depending on the virus. After an incubation period of 2 to 4 weeks, symptoms appear. Then bleeding under the skin begins, often paired with low blood pressure, followed by further internal bleeding throughout the body. Renal dysfunction leading to further health issues, which may cause death, then begins. A milder form of HFRS occurs in Europe, and is called "nephropathia epidemica" (NE). Immune dysregulation, including a mixed Th1/Th2 cytokine response with elevated sTNFR1, IL-6, IL-8, and IL-10, has been proposed to contribute to the severity of HFRS.

=== Hantavirus pulmonary syndrome ===
Hantavirus pulmonary syndrome (HPS), also called hantavirus cardiopulmonary syndrome (HCPS), is usually caused by hantaviruses in the Americas. After an incubation period of 16 to 24 days, symptoms appear. After a few days of symptoms similar to HFRS, there is a sudden onset of progressive, or productive, coughing, shortness of breath, and elevated heart rate, due to fluid buildup in the lungs. These symptoms are accompanied by impairment of lymphoid organs. Death from cardiovascular shock may occur rapidly after the appearance of severe symptoms. While HCPS is typically associated with New World hantaviruses, the Puumala virus in Europe has also, albeit rarely, caused the syndrome.

== Cause ==
The cause is viruses within Orthohantavirus, a genus of single-stranded, enveloped, negative-sense RNA viruses in the family Hantaviridae of the order Elliovirales. They normally cause infection in rodents, but do not cause disease in them. Humans may become infected with hantaviruses through contact with rodent urine, saliva, or feces. While many hantaviruses cause either of the two diseases, some are not known to cause illness, such as the Prospect Hill virus.

=== Transmission ===
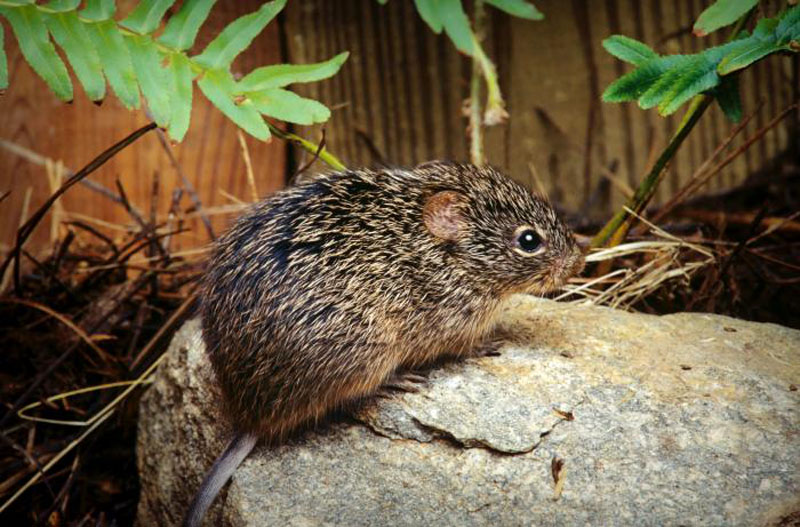
The cotton rat Sigmodon hispidus, is a hantavirus carrier that becomes a threat when it enters human habitation in rural and suburban areas.

Hantaviruses are transmitted by contact with the bodily fluids of rodents, particularly from saliva from bites and especially from inhalation of viral particles from urine and feces in aerosols. The manner of transmission is the same for both diseases caused by hantaviruses. Among the HCPS-causing hantaviruses is the Andes virus, which is the only hantavirus confirmed to be capable of spreading from person to person, though this is rare.

Infections have almost entirely been linked to contact with rodent excrement; however, in 2005 and 2019, human-to-human transmission of the Andes virus was reported in South America.

== Diagnosis ==
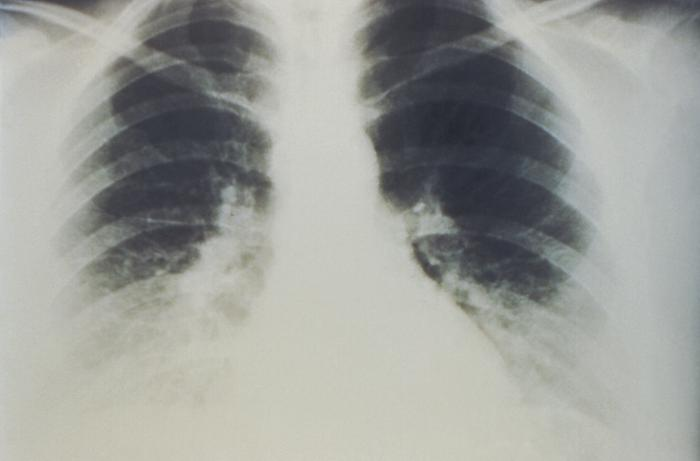
A chest x-ray showing the early stages of bilateral pulmonary effusion due to hantavirus pulmonary syndrome (HPS). HPS begins with interstitial pulmonary edema, progressing to alveolar edema with severe bilateral involvement. Pleural effusions are common.

In terms of the evaluation of this infection, the following is done:

- Chest X-ray (pulmonary edema)
- Blood workup (thrombocytopenia)
- Immunofluorescent or immunoblot assay (ELISA utilizing IgM)

== Prevention ==
The best prevention against contracting hantavirus is to eliminate or minimize contact with rodents in the home, workplace, or campsite. As the virus can be transmitted by rodent saliva, excretions, and bites, control of rats and mice in areas frequented by humans is key for disease prevention. General prevention can be accomplished by disposing of rodent nests, sealing any cracks and holes in homes where mice or rats could enter, setting traps, laying down poisons, or using natural predators such as cats in the home.

The duration that hantaviruses remain infectious in the environment varies based on factors such as the rodent's diet, temperature, humidity, and whether indoors or outdoors. The viruses have been demonstrated to remain active for two to three days at normal room temperature, while ultraviolet rays in direct sunlight kill them within a few hours. However, rodent droppings or urine of indeterminate age should always be treated as infectious. It is advisable to treat most of groceries - especially canned items - as infectious because in spite of all control measures, rodents sneak into the supply chains. Therefore, the disinfection of infection-suspected surfaces is an important prevention measure. Diluted solutions of quaternary ammonium compounds ("quacs"), iodine, sodium hypochlorite (bleach) are highlighted as effective disinfectants. Unlike the traditionally used hypochlorite and iodine, diluted hydrogen peroxide is a non-toxic, less corrosive and environmentally friendlier antimicrobial agent. In addition, a diluted aqueous solution of hydrogen peroxide can be produced in areas located far away from supply chains to meet needs for virus prevention.

=== Vaccine ===
Whole virus inactivated bivalent vaccines against Hantaan virus and Seoul virus are available in China and South Korea. In both countries, the use of the vaccine, combined with other preventive measures, has significantly reduced the incidence of hantavirus infections. Apart from these vaccines, four types of vaccines have been researched: DNA vaccines targeting the M genome segment and the S genome segment, subunit vaccines that use recombinant Gn, Gc, and N proteins of the virus, virus vector vaccines that have recombinant hantavirus proteins inserted in them, and virus-like particle vaccines that contain viral proteins but lack genetic material. Of these, only DNA vaccines have entered into clinical trials. As of 2026 there was no vaccine for the Andes hantavirus.

== Treatment ==
Ribavirin may be a drug for HPS and HFRS but its effectiveness remains unknown; still, spontaneous recovery is possible with supportive treatment. People with suspected hantavirus infection may be admitted to the hospital and given oxygen and mechanical ventilation support to help them breathe during the acute pulmonary stage with severe respiratory distress. Immunotherapy, administration of human neutralizing antibodies during acute phases of Hantavirus, has only been studied in mice, hamsters, and rats. There are no reports of controlled clinical trials.

== Epidemiology ==
Hantavirus infections have been reported from all continents except Australia. Regions especially affected by hemorrhagic fever with renal syndrome include China, the Korean Peninsula, Russia (Hantaan, Puumala and Seoul viruses), and northern and western Europe (Puumala and Dobrava virus). Regions with the highest incidences of hantavirus pulmonary syndrome include Argentina, Chile, Brazil, the United States, Canada, and Panama.

=== Africa ===
In 2010, a novel hantavirus, Sangassou virus was isolated in Africa which causes hemorrhagic fever with renal syndrome.

=== Asia ===
In mainland China, Hong Kong, the Korean Peninsula and Russia, hemorrhagic fever with renal syndrome is caused by Hantaan, Puumala and Seoul viruses.

=== Australia ===
As of 2005, there were no human infections reported in Australia, though rodents were found to carry antibodies.

=== Europe ===
In Europe two hantaviruses – Puumala and Dobrava-Belgrade viruses – are known to cause hemorrhagic fever with renal syndrome. Puumala usually causes a generally mild disease, nephropathia epidemica, which typically presents with fever, headache, gastrointestinal symptoms, impaired renal function and blurred vision. Dobrava infections are similar, except that they often also have hemorrhagic complications.

Puumala virus is carried by its rodent host, the bank vole (Clethrionomys glareolus), and is present throughout most of Europe, except for the Mediterranean region. There are four known Dobrava virus genotypes, each carried by a different rodent species. Genotype Dobrava is found in the yellow-necked mouse (Apodemus flavicollis); genotypes Saaremaa and Kurkino in the striped field mouse (Apodemus agrarius), and genotype Sochi in the Black Sea field mouse (Apodemus ponticus).

In 2017 alone, the Robert Koch Institute (RKI) in Germany received 1,713 notifications of hantavirus infections.

=== North America ===
==== Canada ====
The primary cause of the disease in Canada is Sin Nombre virus-infected deer mice. Between 1989 and 2014, there were a total of 109 confirmed cases, with the death rate estimated at 29%. The virus exists in deer mice nationwide, but cases were concentrated in western Canada (British Columbia, Alberta, Saskatchewan and Manitoba) with only one case in eastern Canada. In Canada "[a]ll cases occurred in rural settings and approximately 70% of the cases have been associated with domestic and farming activities."

==== United States ====
As of January 2017, 728 cases of hantaviral disease had been reported in the United States cumulatively since 1995, across 36 states, not including cases with presumed exposure outside the United States. More than 96% of cases have occurred in states west of the Mississippi River. The top 10 states by number of cases reported (which differs slightly from a count ordered by the state of original exposure) were New Mexico (109), Colorado (104), Arizona (78), California (61), Washington (50), Texas (45), Montana (43), Utah (38), Idaho (21), and Oregon (21); 36% of the total reported cases have resulted in death.

==== Mexico ====
In Mexico, rodents have been found to carry hantaviruses include Thomas's giant deer mouse (Megadontomys thomasi), the pack rat Neotoma picta, Orizaba deer mouse (Peromyscus beatae), Western harvest mouse (Reithrodontomys megalotis) and Sumichrast's harvest mouse (Reithrodontomys sumichrasti).

=== South America ===
Agents of HPS found in South America include the Andes virus (also called Oran, Castelo de Sonhos – Portuguese for "Castle of Dreams", Lechiguanas, Juquitiba, Araraquara, and Bermejo virus, among many other synonyms), which is the only hantavirus that has shown an interpersonal form of transmission, and the Laguna Negra virus, an extremely close relative of the previously known Rio Mamore virus.

Rodents that have been shown to carry hantaviruses include Abrothrix longipilis and Oligoryzomys longicaudatus.

==== 2026 MV Hondius hantavirus outbreak ====
On 3 May 2026, a suspected outbreak of hantavirus was reported aboard the cruise ship MV Hondius in the Atlantic Ocean, resulting in three deaths. While the ship had departed Argentina three weeks prior, it was located off the coast of Cape Verde at the time the outbreak gained international attention. The following day, the World Health Organization issued a statement confirming that "seven cases (two laboratory confirmed cases of hantavirus and five suspected cases) have been identified, including three deaths, one critically ill patient and three individuals reporting mild symptoms". The ship was carrying a total of 147 passengers and crew at the time of the report. While anchored off the coast of Praia, Cape Verde, authorities barred passengers from disembarking to protect national public health.

On 6 May, an eighth case was identified, while the ship was on its way to the Canary Islands.

== History ==
12th-century Chinese texts describe diseases with clinical features similar to hantavirus infection. In late medieval England, a mysterious sweating sickness swept through the country in 1485, just before the Battle of Bosworth Field. Noting that the symptoms overlap with hantavirus pulmonary syndrome, several scientists have theorized that the virus may have been the cause of the disease. The hypothesis was criticized because sweating sickness was recorded as being transmitted from human to human, whereas hantaviruses were not known to spread in this way.

Trench nephritis during World War I may have been hantavirus infection.

The first clinical recognition was in 1931 in Northeast China. Around the same time in the 1930s, nephropathia epidemica was identified in Sweden.

HFRS came to the recognition of western physicians during the Korean War between 1951 and 1954 when more than 3,000 United Nations soldiers fell ill in an outbreak. In 1976, the first pathogenic hantavirus, the Hantaan virus, was isolated from rodents near the Hantan River in South Korea. Other prominent hantaviruses that cause HFRS, including the Dobrava-Belgrade virus, Puumala virus, and Seoul virus, were identified in the years after then and are collectively referred to as the Old World hantaviruses.

In 1993, an outbreak of HCPS, then unrecognized, occurred in the Four Corners region of the United States and led to the discovery of the Sin Nombre virus. Since then, approximately 43 hantavirus strains, of which 20 are pathogenic, have been found in the Americas and are referred to as the New World hantaviruses. This includes the Andes virus, one of the primary causes of HCPS in South America and the only hantavirus known to be capable of person-to-person transmission.

In March 2025, it was determined that Betsy Arakawa, the wife of actor Gene Hackman, had died the previous month to hantavirus pulmonary syndrome.

In April 2026, an outbreak occurred on the cruise ship MV Hondius causing the death of three passengers on board. The ship was heading from Ushuaia, Argentina, to Cape Verde.

== See also ==
- 1993 Four Corners hantavirus outbreak
- 2012 Yosemite hantavirus outbreak
- MV Hondius hantavirus outbreak
