= Hantavirus outbreak =

Hantavirus outbreak may refer to:

- 1993 Four Corners hantavirus outbreak
- 2012 Yosemite hantavirus outbreak
- 2026 MV Hondius hantavirus outbreak
