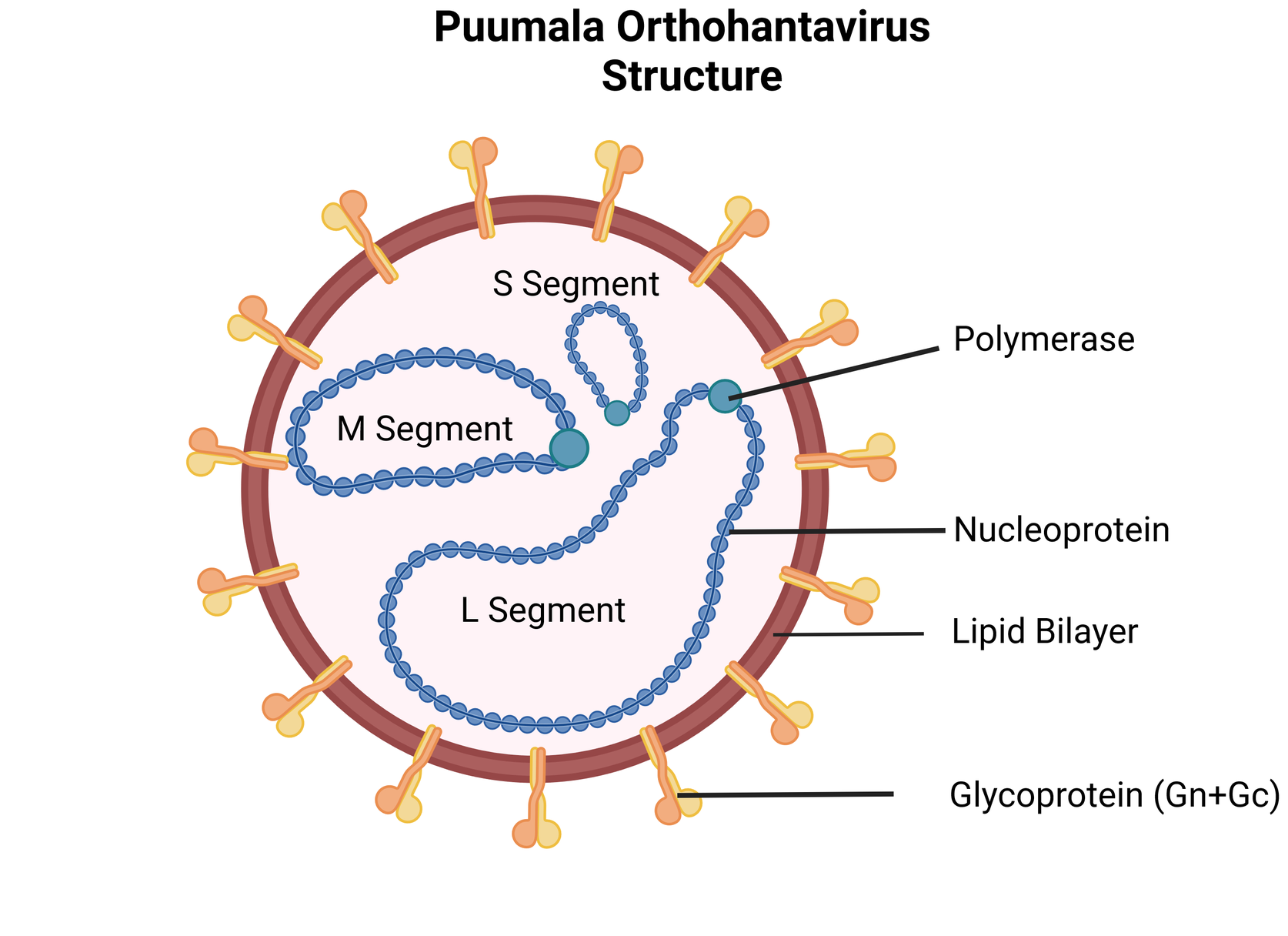
- Structure of Orthohantavirus puumalaense

Virus classification
- (unranked): Virus
- Realm: Riboviria
- Kingdom: Orthornavirae
- Phylum: Negarnaviricota
- Class: Bunyaviricetes
- Order: Elliovirales
- Family: Hantaviridae
- Genus: Orthohantavirus
- Species: Orthohantavirus puumalaense
- Virus: Puumala virus

Synonyms
- Puumala hantavirus; Puumala orthohantavirus

= Puumala virus =

Human virus discovered in 1980

Puumala virus (PUUV) is the main cause of hemorrhagic fever with renal syndrome (HFRS) in Europe and Russia. Puumala virus is transmitted by the bank vole (Clethrionomys glareolus). In its natural reservoir, PUUV causes a persistent infection with few symptoms and is spread through excretions, fighting, and grooming. Humans can become infected by inhaling aerosols that contain rodent saliva, urine, or feces, as well as through bites and scratches. In humans, infection is usually asymptomatic but can lead to a mild form of HFRS often called nephropathia epidemica (NE). Symptoms include fever and headache, impaired vision, as well as the appearance of spots on the skin and renal symptoms such as kidney swelling, excess protein in urine, blood in urine, decreased urine production, and kidney failure. The case fatality rate from infection is less than 1%.

The genome of PUUV is about 12 kilobases (kb) in length and segmented into three negative-sense, single-stranded RNA (-ssRNA) strands. The small strand encodes the viral nucleoprotein, the medium strand encodes the viral spike protein, which attaches to cell receptors for entry into cells, and a non-structural protein that interferes with interferon production, and the long strand encodes the viral RNA-dependent RNA polymerase (RdRp), which replicates and transcribes the genome. Genome segments are encased in nucleoproteins to form ribonucleoprotein (RNP) complexes that are surrounded by a viral envelope that contains spikes emanating from its surface.

Puumala virus replicates first by binding to the surface of cells with its envelope spikes. Virus particles, called virions, are then taken into the cell by endosomes, where a drop in pH causes the viral envelope to fuse with the endosome, which releases viral RNA into the host cell. RdRp then transcribes the genome for translation by host cell ribosomes and produces copies of the genome for progeny viruses. New virions are assembled at the endoplasmic reticulum and bud from its surface to obtain their viral envelope. Progeny viruses are then transported by a cellular vesicle to the cell membrane, where they leave the cell by exocytosis.

PUUV was discovered in 1980 after being extracted from bank voles. The virus was subsequently linked to a past outbreak among soldiers in Finland during World War Two, when the disease received the name nephropathia epidemica. A similar outbreak occurred among soldiers in Croatia during the Balkan Wars. PUUV is found throughout Europe and Russia where the vole bank lives. Finland is the country most affected by PUUV and experiences thousands of infections each year. While infection is typically associated with HFRS, Puumala virus can cause hantavirus pulmonary syndrome on rare occasions.

== Genome ==
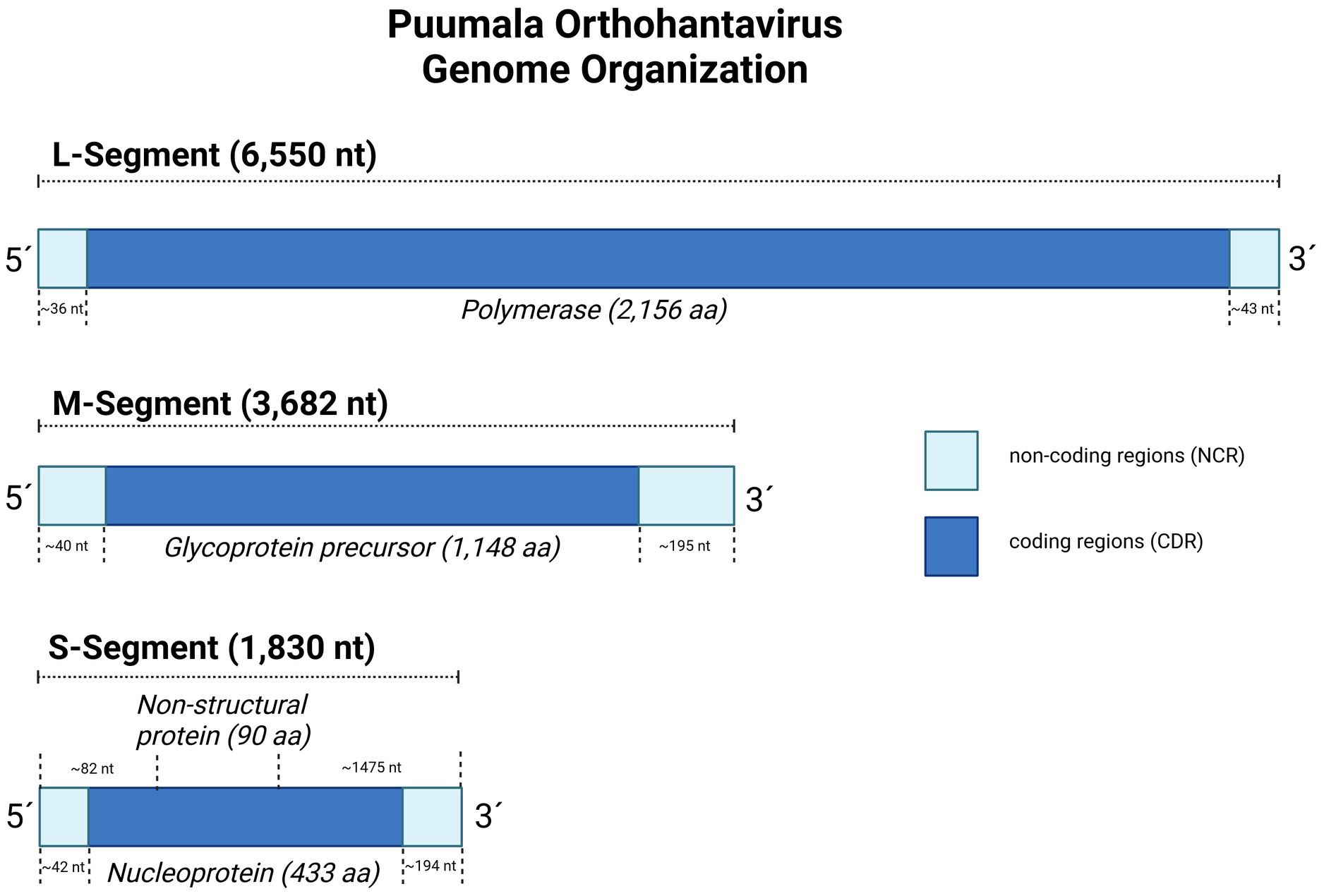
L- M- S- Genome Organization

The genome of Puumala virus is about 12 thousand nucleotides in length and segmented into three negative-sense, single-stranded RNA (-ssRNA) strands. The segments form into circles via non-covalent bonding of the ends of the genome. The small segment, about 1.83 kilobases (kb) in length, encodes the viral nucleoprotein and a non-structural protein that inhibits interferon production. The medium segment, about 3.65 kb in length. encodes a glycoprotein precursor that is cleaved into the two spike proteins Gn and Gc during virion assembly. The large segment, about 6.55 kb in length, encodes the viral RNA-dependent RNA polymerase (RdRp), which is responsible for transcribing and replicating the genome. The ends of each segment contain untranslated terminal regions (UTRs) that are involved in the replication and transcription of the genome.

== Structure ==
Virions are mostly spherical or pleomorphic in shape and range from 80 to 160 nm in diameter. They contain a lipid envelope covered in spike proteins made of the two viral glycoproteins, Gn and Gc. The spike proteins extend about 10 nm out from the surface and are tetrameric, consisting of four copies each of Gn and Gc with helical symmetry, in which Gn forms the stalk of the spike and Gc the head. Spikes are arranged on the surface in a lattice pattern. Inside the envelope are the three genome segments, which are encased in nucleoproteins to form a ribonucleoprotein (RNP) complex. Attached to each RNP complex is a copy of RdRp.

== Life cycle ==
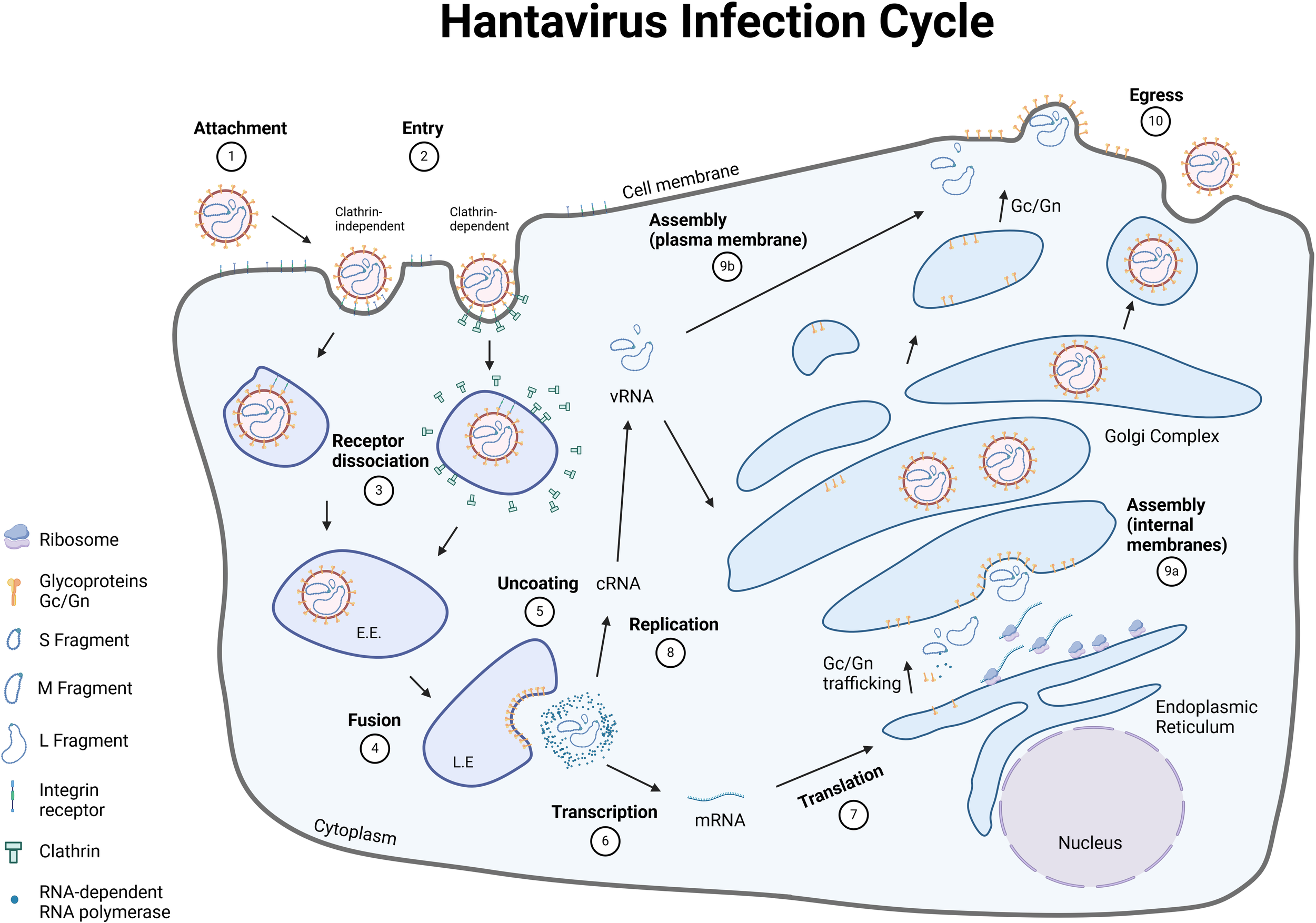

PUUV primarily infects endothelial cells and macrophages. It enters cells by using β3-integrins as receptors. Virions are taken into a cell via an endosome. Once pH is lowered, the viral envelope fuses with the endosome, which releases viral RNA into the host cell's cytoplasm. The small segment is transcribed by RdRp first, then the medium segment, and lastly the large segment. Once the genome has been transcribed, RdRp snatches caps from host messenger RNA (mRNA) to create viral mRNA that is primed for translation by host ribosomes to produce viral proteins.

For replication of the genome, a complementary positive-sense strand is produced by RdRp. Copies of the genome are made from this complementary strand. Progeny RNA strands are then encapsidated by nucleoproteins. During replication, the glycoprotein is cleaved in the endoplasmic reticulum by the host signal peptidase during translation. This produces Gn at the N-terminus and Gc at the C-terminus of the protein. Spike proteins are expressed on the surface of the endoplasmic reticulum. Viral RNPs are transported to the endoplasmic reticulum where they bud from the surface, thereby obtaining their envelope. Progeny viruses are then transported by a cellular vesicle to the cell membrane, where they leave the cell via exocytosis.

== Diversity ==
PUUV is traditionally divided into eight recognized genetic lineages: Central European, Alpe-Adrian, Danish, South-Scandinavian, North-Scandinavian, Finnish, Russian, and Latvian. The Central European lineage has been reported from France, Belgium, Germany, Slovakia, and the Netherlands; Alpe-Adrian in Austria, Slovenia, Croatia, and Hungary; Danish in Denmark; South-Scandinavian in Norway and southern Sweden; North-Scandinavian in northern Sweden; Finnish in Finland, Karelia, and western Siberia; Russian in Estonia, Latvia, and central Russia; and Latvian in Latvia and northeast Poland. These lineages likely emerged from isolation of bank voles in glacial refuges during the during the last glaciation and subsequent postglacial recolonization. After the last glacial period, bank voles recolonized much of Eurasia and carried the different lineages with them. No consistent lineage-specific differences in human pathogenicity have been demonstrated so far.

== Evolution ==
The most common way that hantaviruses evolve is through mutations of individual nucleotides being inserted, deleted, or substituted. Because Puumala virus has a segmented genome, it is possible for recombination and reassortment of segments to occur, whereby segments from different lineages mix in a single host cell and produce hybrid progeny. This has been observed in Europe, where different lineages of Puumala virus that have overlapping ranges frequently reassort. These reassorted Puumala viruses are not competitively superior to Puumala viruses that have not undergone reassortment. The M segment of the genome is the segment most commonly involved in reassortment.

== Ecology ==
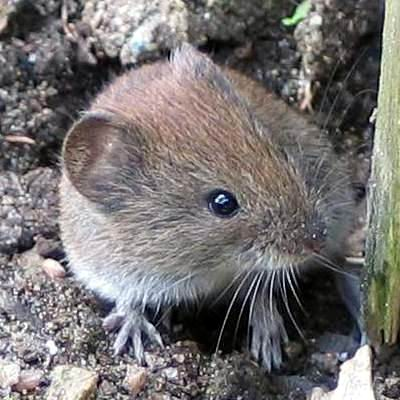
The bank vole, the natural reservoir of Puumala virus.

Puumala virus is carried by bank voles (Clethrionomys glareolus), found throughout Europe and Russia. Incidence of NE changes based on the bank vole population, which fluctuates on a 3–4 year cycle. Prevalence of PUUV in bank voles is highest in late autumn during increase and peak years. In more northern environments, bank vole populations fluctuate primarily due to predation, whereas in more temperate environments fluctuation is driven by deciduous tree masting. PUUV transmission and PE incidence likewise vary based on geography: transmission in boreal zones is greatest in autumn to early winter and in temperate zones greatest in spring to summer. During winter, the food supply of bank voles declines significantly, which leads them to enter human dwellings in search of food. This increases the likelihood of transmission to humans during winter in colder climates.

In its natural reservoir, PUUV causes a persistent and mainly asymptomatic infection. Wild bank voles shed the virus for the rest of their life after they become infected. High levels of maternal antibodies in newborns may delay the time at which they get infected, which indirectly delays the incidence of human infections in various years. Bank voles infected with PUUV have a lower winter survival rate than uninfected ones, possibly due to effects on metabolism. PUUV infection also affects the body condition of the mother, which affects the body condition of offspring. Transmission of Puumala virus occurs through inhalation of aerosols that contain saliva, urine, or feces, as well as through contaminated food, bites, and physical contact with bank vole excretions. Antibodies to Puumala virus have been detected in cattle, deer, and rabbits, but the role of these animals as hosts is unknown.

== Disease ==
Puumala virus infection is subclinical with no apparent symptoms 70–80% of the time. When symptoms appear, PUUV usually causes a mild form of hemorrhagic fever with renal syndrome (HFRS) often called nephropathia epidemica (NE). Symptoms usually occur 2–6 weeks after exposure and come in five phases: fever, hypotension, low urine production, high urine production, then recovery. HFRS is hallmarked by acute kidney disease with kidney swelling, excess protein in urine, and blood in urine. Early symptoms include fever, headache, lower back pain, nausea, vomiting, diarrhea, bloody stool, and the appearance of spots on the skin. During the hypotensive phase, there is a sudden lowering of blood pressure and shock due to microvascular leakage. Low urine production then occurs as a result of renal failure. As renal function recovers, urine production increases. In addition to standard HFRS symptoms, PUUV infection frequently causes ocular and central nervous symptoms during the early phase of the disease, including blurry vision, near-sightedness, vertigo, and rarely encephalitis. In more mild cases, the different phases of illness may be hard to distinguish, or some phases may be absent, while in more severe cases, the phases may overlap.

PUUV infection is mainly observed in northern and central Europe and Russia, where it is the main cause of HFRS. Incidence of hantavirus infection in Europe has been growing over time and is highest in Finland, where PUUV causes 1,000–3,000 HFRS cases yearly. The main risk factor for infection is visiting forested and suburban areas and, in the cold season, staying indoors during that time period. Smoking is a risk factor for more severe renal symptoms. Increased amounts of protein, blood, and glucose in urine and increased levels of inflammatory markers such as interleukin-6 are strong predictors of increased disease severity. Symptoms are less severe in children than in adults. The case fatality rate from PUUV infection is low, at 0.08–0.4%, and nearly everyone recovers fully without long term consequences. Death usually only occurs among the elderly. On rare occasions, individual cases and small clusters of hantavirus pulmonary syndrome have been observed in Europe and in Turkey.

PUUV infection is diagnosed based on observation of symptoms and testing for hantavirus nucleic acid, proteins, or hantavirus-specific antibodies. Because of how mild illness caused by PUUV can be, it is often misdiagnosed. Treatment is supportive in nature and includes intravenous hydration, electrolyte therapy, platelet transfusions, and, in cases of kidney injury or failure, intermittent dialysis and continuous renal replacement therapy. No vaccines exist to protect against Puumala virus infection; the main way to prevent infection is to avoid or minimize contact with rodents. Repeated infections of hantaviruses have not been observed, so recovering from infection likely grants life-long immunity.

== Classification ==
Puumala virus is classified into the species Orthohantavirus puumalaense in the genus Orthohantavirus, which is in the family Hantaviridae, the family that all hantaviruses belong to. Other members of Orthohantavirus puumalaense include Hokkaido virus and Muju virus. The CG1820 isolate of Puumala virus is the exemplar virus of the species. This taxonomy is shown hereafter:

- Family: Hantaviridae
  - Genus: Orthohantavirus
    - Species: Orthohantavirus puumalaense
      - Hokkaido virus, found in grey red-backed voles (Craseomys rufocanus) in Hokkaido, Japan and Siberia, Russia and in northern red-backed voles (Clethrionomys rutilus) in Siberia, Russia
      - Guyuan virus, found in grey red-backed voles (Craseomys rufocanus) in China
      - Muju virus, found in royal voles (Craseomys regulus) in South Korea
      - Puumala virus

== History ==
In 1942, an epidemic of disease occurred among soldiers in Salla, Eastern Lapland, Finland during the Second World War. Around 1,000 German and 60 Finnish soldiers were affected. Symptoms included fever, headache, abdominal pain, back pain, nausea, and vomiting. Notably, temporarily impaired vision was noted in many patients, as were increased protein in urine, blood in urine, and reduced renal function. The novel disease was named "nephropathia epidemica". Reports at the time suspected leptospirosis and noted that it could not spread from person to person. No cases during the outbreak resulted in death. Both bank voles and Norway lemmings were suspected as having caused the epidemic, but hantaviruses have not been discovered in Norway lemmings, which left just the bank vole, and thus Puumala virus, as likely responsible for the Salla epidemic. Another epidemic occurred in 1995 in Croatia during the Balkan Wars. As with the 1942 epidemic, the outbreak mainly occurred in soldiers who lived in poor conditions such as trenches and wooden huts in forests. This exposed them to rodents that carried the virus. In addition to PUUV, Dobrava virus was also responsible for the 1995 epidemic.

In 1980, Markus Brummer-Korvenkontio and Antti Vaheri tested for hantavirus infection in the lung tissue of bank voles using immunofluorescent antibody tests, a method similar to what was used to discover the first hantavirus, Hantaan virus. Subsequent testing of the Finnish population showed that many Finns had been infected with the virus. Two names were considered for this newly discovered virus, both names of Finnish municipalities: Puumala and Pieksämäki, the former of which was chosen since the latter would be more difficult for English speakers to pronounce. Puumala virus was accepted as a species by the International Committee on Taxonomy of Viruses in 1987 and has undergone a series of changes to its species name, first changing to Puumala hantavirus, then Puumala orthohantavirus, and most recently to the current Orthohantavirus puumalaense.
