= 2012 Yosemite hantavirus outbreak =

Viral outbreak in California, US

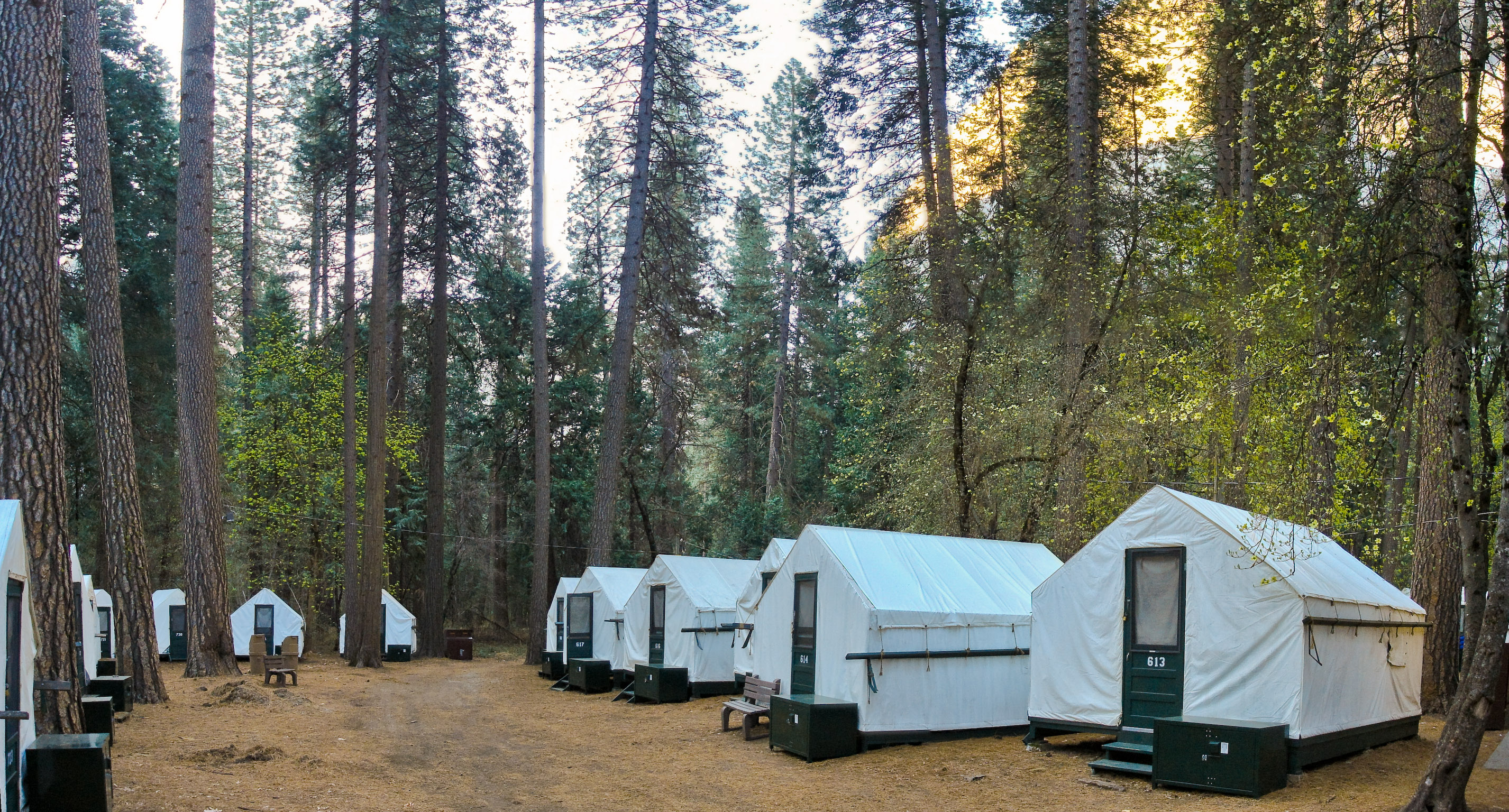
- Tent cabins in Curry Village
- Disease: Hantavirus infection, including hantavirus pulmonary syndrome
- Pathogen: Sin Nombre hantavirus
- Location: Curry Village, Yosemite National Park, California, United States
- Date: 2012
- Confirmed cases: 10
- Deaths: 3

The 2012 Yosemite hantavirus outbreak was an outbreak of hantavirus infections linked to visits to Yosemite National Park in California, United States, during 2012. The outbreak was unusual and represented a rare type of hantavirus outbreak, linked to rodent exposure in a specific type of housing.

== History ==
The outbreak was associated primarily with tent cabins in Curry Village, where visitors were exposed to deer mice carrying the Sin Nombre hantavirus strain.

The outbreak resulted in nine confirmed cases of hantavirus pulmonary syndrome (HPS) in visitors to Curry Village, and in one who lived 15 miles away. Three people died from the disease. Following the discovery of the outbreak, the National Park Service closed and disinfected hundreds of tent cabins and notified thousands of visitors who may have been exposed.

Health authorities from the Centers for Disease Control and Prevention and California investigated the outbreak. Officials determined that insulation in the tent cabin walls provided nesting spaces for infected rodents, increasing the risk of human exposure.

== Significance ==
At least until 2014, the 2012 hantavirus outbreak at Yosemite National Park was the largest recognised Sin Nombre virus outbreak in the U.S. since the 1993 Four Corners hantavirus outbreak, and included a case of HPS with an unusually long 49 days incubation period. (Note: Hantavirus surveillance in the U.S. commenced in 1993. From then to 2023, 890 cases were reported in the U.S.)

The outbreak led to a marked increase in testing for Sin Nombre virus specific IgM by the National Reference Laboratory in 2012. The additional data helped refine hantavirus antibody testing algorithms and improve specificity by raising the cutoff required for a positive result, thereby reducing false-positive results.

The social significance of the 2012 Yosemite hantavirus outbreak included increased public awareness and fear of rodent-borne disease, disruption to tourism at Yosemite National Park, and improved public health communication, surveillance, and prevention measures for HPS.

== Timeline ==
=== 2012 ===
- 2 July: Onset of illness in an affected individual who had been staying at Curry Village since 3 June.
- 16 August: California Department of Public Health report two confirmed cases of HPS in Californians who had resided in Yosemite National Park.
- 21–22 August: 185 traps are placed around Curry Village.
- 27 August:
  - US National Park Service report that in 2012 three visitors of Yosemite National Park had been diagnosed with HPS and a further visitor was suspected as having the illness. All four visitors, two of whom died, had stayed at the Curry Village's signature tent cabins.
  - Other visitors contacted and asked to seek medical attention if have symptoms.
- 28 August: All 91 signature tent cabins at Yosemite are closed.
- 30 August: US National Park Service report total confirmed cases reaches six.
- 4–5 September: 89 traps placed in Tuolumne Meadows and 133 in Curry Village.
- 1 November:
  - US National Park Service report total confirmed cases reaches 10, with three deaths.
  - Nine of 10 cases reported to have stayed at signature tent cabins in Curry Village.

=== 2013 ===
- 25 May: Hantavirus is detected in 14% of Curry Village's deer mice.

== See also ==
- MV Hondius hantavirus outbreak
