= Hantavirus pulmonary syndrome =

Viral pulmonary disease of humans

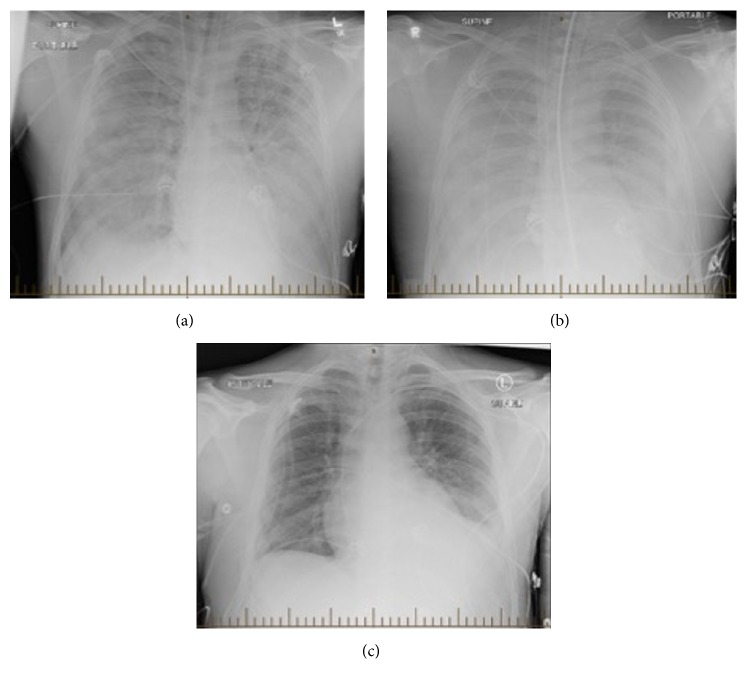
- Progression of hantavirus pulmonary syndrome
- Specialty: Pulmonology
- Symptoms: Fever, cough, shortness of breath, headaches, muscle pains, lethargy, nausea, diarrhea
- Complications: Respiratory failure, cardiac failure
- Causes: Hantaviruses spread by rodents
- Prevention: Rodent control
- Treatment: Supportive, including mechanical ventilation
- Medication: None
- Prognosis: Poor, 30–60% case fatality rate

Hantavirus pulmonary syndrome (HPS), also called hantavirus cardiopulmonary syndrome (HCPS), is a severe respiratory disease caused by hantavirus infection. The main features of illness are microvascular leakage and acute respiratory distress syndrome. Symptoms occur anywhere from one to eight weeks after exposure to the virus and come in three distinct phases. First, there is an early phase with flu-like symptoms such as fever, muscle aches, headache, and shortness of breath, as well as low platelet count. Second, there is a cardiopulmonary phase during which people experience elevated or irregular heart rate, cardiogenic shock, and pulmonary capillary leakage, which can lead to respiratory failure, low blood pressure, and buildup of fluid in the lungs and chest cavity. The final phase is recovery, which typically takes months, but difficulties with breathing can persist for up to two years. The disease has a case fatality rate of 30 to 60 percent. Death usually occurs suddenly during the cardiopulmonary phase.

HPS is caused mainly by infection with New World hantaviruses in the Americas. In North America, Sin Nombre virus is the most common cause of HPS and is transmitted by the western deer mouse. In South America, Andes virus is the most common cause of HPS and is transmitted mainly by the long-tailed pygmy rice rat. In their rodent hosts, these hantaviruses cause a persistent, asymptomatic infection. Transmission occurs mainly through inhalation of aerosols that contain rodent saliva, urine, or feces, but can also occur through contaminated food, bites, and scratches. Vascular endothelial cells and macrophages are the primary cells infected by hantaviruses, and infection causes abnormalities with blood clotting, all of which result in fluid leakage responsible for the more severe symptoms. Recovery from infection likely confers lifelong protection.

The main way to prevent infection is to avoid or minimize contact with rodents that carry hantaviruses. Removing sources of food for rodents, safely cleaning up after them, and preventing them from entering one's house are all important means of protection. People who are at risk of interacting with infected rodents can wear masks to protect themselves. No vaccines exist that protect against HPS. Initial diagnosis of infection can be made based on epidemiological information and symptoms. Confirmation of infection can be done by testing for hantavirus nucleic acid, proteins, or hantavirus-specific antibodies. Supportive treatment is always performed for HPS and entails continual cardiac monitoring and respiratory support, including mechanical ventilation, extracorporeal membrane oxygenation (ECMO), and hemofiltration. No specific antiviral drugs exist for hantavirus infection.

In North America, dozens of HPS cases occur each year, while in South America, more than 100 cases occur every year. Isolated cases and small outbreaks have occurred in Europe and Turkey. The distribution of viruses that cause HPS is directly tied to the distribution of their natural reservoir. Transmission is also greatly influenced by environmental factors such as rainfall, temperature, and humidity, which affect the rodent population and virus transmissibility. The discovery of HPS came in 1993 during an outbreak in the Four Corners region of the United States, which was indirectly caused by the El Niño climate pattern. Sin Nombre virus was found to be responsible for the outbreak, and since then, numerous other hantaviruses that cause HPS have been identified throughout the Americas.

== Signs and symptoms ==
HPS symptoms occur about 1–8 weeks after exposure to the virus. The main features of the illness are microvascular leakage and acute respiratory distress syndrome (ARDS). The disease has three phases: early (prodromal), cardiopulmonary, and recovery. Prodromal symptoms last for 1–5 days and include flu-like symptoms such as fever, headache, muscle pain (myalgia), nausea, vomiting, dizziness, chills, coughing, and shortness of breath (dyspnea), as well as low platelet count in the blood (thrombocytopenia). Within 10 days, the cardiopulmonary phase begins and lasts for several days. It is marked by elevated heart rate (tachycardia), irregular heartbeats (arrhythmias), and cardiogenic shock, a condition in which the heart is unable to pump enough blood for the body. Pulmonary capillary leakage can lead to respiratory failure, buildup of fluids in the lungs (pulmonary edema), low blood pressure (hypotension), and buildup of fluid in the chest cavity between the lungs and chest wall (pleural effusion).

While HPS is typically associated with cardiopulmonary symptoms, it may include renal symptoms typically associated with hemorrhagic fever with renal syndrome (HFRS), namely acute kidney injury and excess protein in urine (proteinuria), which sometimes occur during the cardiopulmonary phase. During the recovery phase, increased urination (polyuria) occurs as renal function returns. Repeated infections of hantaviruses have not been observed, so recovering from infection likely grants life-long immunity.

== Virology ==
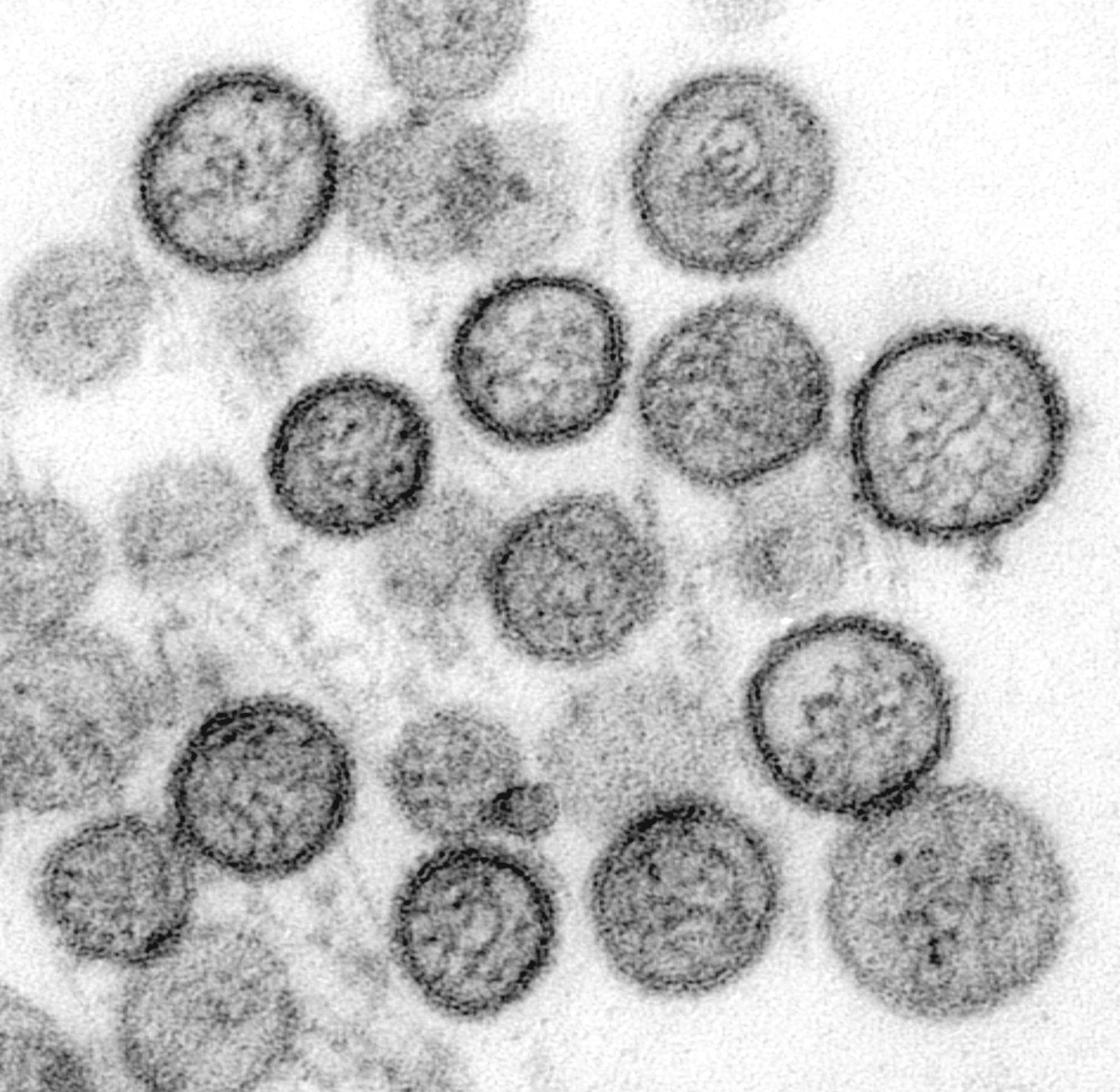
Transmission electron micrograph of Sin Nombre virus

=== Genome and structure ===
The genome of hantaviruses is segmented into three parts: the large (L), medium (M), and small (S) segments. Each part is a single-stranded negative-sense RNA strand, consisting of 10,000–15,000 nucleotides in total. The segments form into circles via non-covalent bonding of the ends of the genome. The L segment is about 6.6 kilobases (kb) in length and encodes RNA-dependent RNA polymerase (RdRp), which mediates transcription and replication of viral RNA. The M segment, about 3.7 kb in length, encodes a glycoprotein precursor that is co-translated and cleaved into Gn and Gc. Gn and Gc bind to cell receptors, regulate immune responses, and induce protective antibodies. The S segment is around 2.1 kb in length and encodes the N protein, which binds to and protects viral RNA. An open reading frame in the N gene on the S segment of some hantaviruses also encodes the non-structural protein NS that inhibits interferon production in host cells. The untranslated regions at the ends of the genome are highly conserved and participate in the replication and transcription of the genome.

Individual hantavirus particles (virions) are usually spherical, but may be oval, pleomorphic, or tubular. The diameter of the virion is 70–350 nanometers (nm). The lipid envelope is about 5 nm thick. Embedded in the envelope are the surface spike glycoproteins Gn and Gc, which are arranged in a lattice pattern. Each surface spike is composed of a tetramer of Gn and Gc (four units each) that has four-fold rotational symmetry and extends about 10 nm out from the envelope. Gn forms the stalk of the spike and Gc the head. Inside the envelope are helical nucleocapsids made of many copies of the nucleocapsid protein N, which interact with the virus's genome and RdRp. Hantaviruses do not encode matrix proteins to assist with structuring the virion, so how surface proteins organize into a sphere with a symmetrical lattice is not yet known.

=== Life cycle ===
Vascular endothelial cells and macrophages are the primary cells infected by hantaviruses. Podocytes, tubular cells, dendritic cells, and lymphocytes can also be infected. Attachment and entry into the host cell is mediated by the binding of the viral glycoprotein spikes to host cell receptors, particularly β1 and β3 integrins. Decay acceleration factors, complement receptors, and, for New World hantaviruses, protocadherin-1 have also been proposed to be involved in attachment. After attachment, hantaviruses rely on several ways to enter a cell, including micropinocytosis, clathrin-independent receptor-mediated endocytosis and cholesterol- or caveolae-dependent endocytosis. Old World hantaviruses use clathrin-dependent endocytosis while New World hantaviruses use clathrin-independent endocytosis.

After entering a cell, virions form vesicles that are transported to early endosomes, then late endosomes and lysosomal compartments. A decrease in pH then causes the viral envelope to fuse with the endosome or lysosome. This fusion releases viral ribonucleoprotein complexes into the cell cytoplasm, initiating transcription and replication by RdRp. RdRp transcribes viral -ssRNA into complementary positive-sense strands, then snatches 5′ ("five prime") ends of host messenger RNA (mRNA) to prepare mRNA for translation by host ribosomes to produce viral proteins. Complementary RNA strands are also used to produce copies of the genome, which are encapsulated by N proteins to form RNPs.

During virion assembly, the glycoprotein precursor is cleaved in the endoplasmic reticulum into the Gn and Gc glycoproteins by host cell signal peptidases. Gn and Gc are modified by N-glycan chains, which stabilize the spike structure and assist in assembly in the Golgi apparatus for Old World hantaviruses or at the cell membrane for New World hantaviruses. Old World hantaviruses obtain their viral envelope from the Golgi apparatus and are then transported to the cell membrane in vesicles to leave the cell via exocytosis. On the other hand, New World hantavirus RNPs are transported to the cell membrane, where they bud from the surface of the cell to obtain their envelope and leave the cell.

=== Evolution ===
The most common form of evolution for hantaviruses is mutations through single nucleotide substitutions, insertions, and deletions. Hantaviruses are usually restricted to individual natural reservoir species and evolve alongside their hosts, but this one-species-one-hantavirus relationship is not true for all hantaviruses. The exact evolutionary history of hantaviruses is likely obscured by many instances of genome reassortment, host spillover, and host-switching. Because hantaviruses have segmented genomes, they are capable of genetic recombination and reassortment in which segments from different viruses can combine to form new viruses. This occurs often in nature and facilitates the adaptation of hantaviruses to multiple hosts and ecosystems. In particular, reassortment in NWHVs of the S and M segments has been observed in rodents. Diploid progeny are also possible, in which virions may possess two of the same segment from two parent viruses.

== Mechanism ==
=== Transmission ===
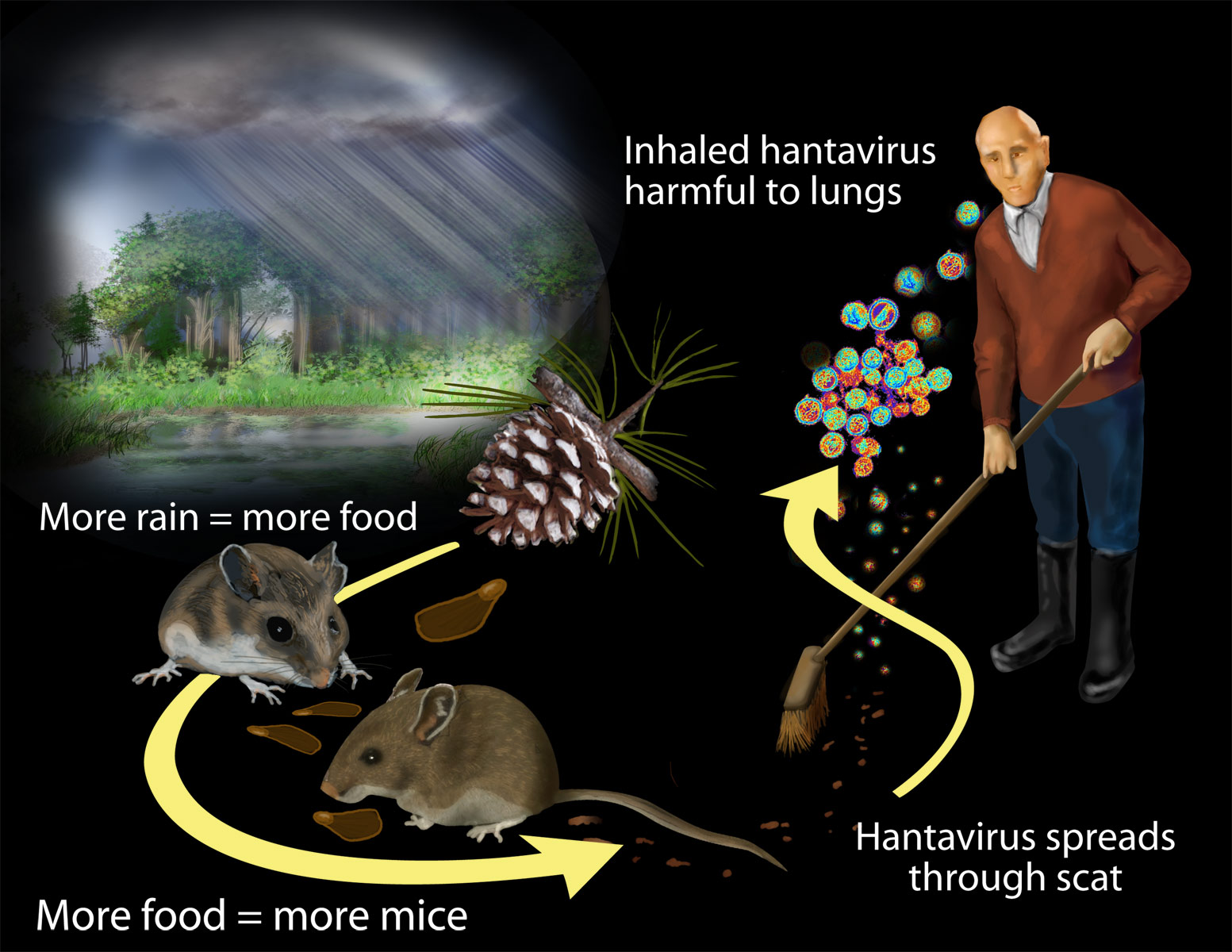
Hantavirus spread

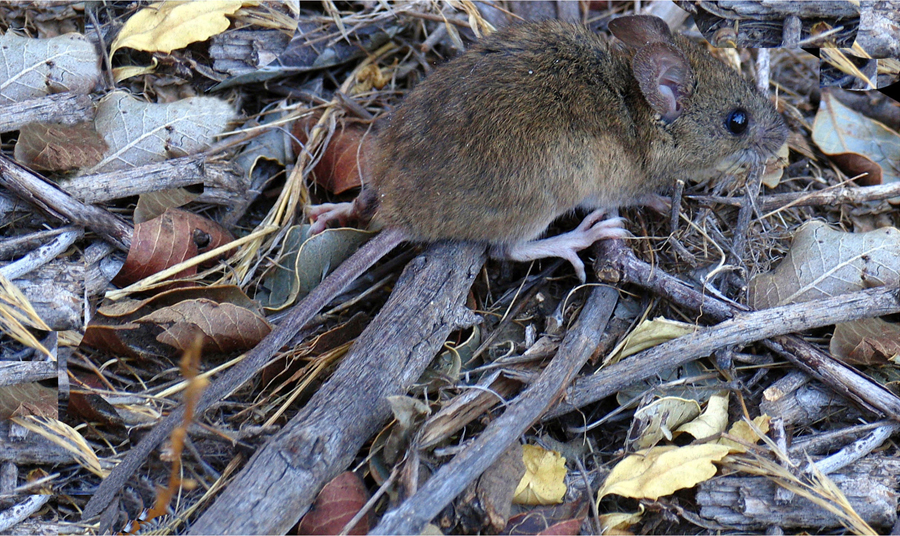
The long-tailed pygmy rice rat, the primary reservoir of Andes virus

The western deer mouse, the natural reservoir of Sin Nombre virus (Note: Many sources identify the natural reservoir of Sin Nombre virus as the species Peromyscus maniculatus. In fact, the natural reservoir of the virus is the species Peromyscus sonoriensis. The reason for this discrepancy is that the two species previously were classified as one, both under the scientific name Peromyscus maniculatus. This species was reorganized in the late 2010s and split into multiple species, including P. maniculatus and P. sonoriensis. The "old" P. maniculatus had a range extending across most of North America, whereas the "new" P. maniculatus is limited to the northeastern parts of the United States east of the Mississippi River and southeastern Canada. P. sonoriensis, on the other hand, is found in most of the United States west of the Mississippi River and in most of southwestern Canada, which corresponds to where Sin Nombre virus infections usually occur.)

Rodents transmit hantaviruses that cause illness in humans. In rodents, hantaviruses usually cause an asymptomatic, persistent infection. Infected animals can spread the virus to uninfected animals through aerosols or droplets from their feces, urine, saliva, and blood, through consumption of contaminated food, from virus particles shed from skin or fur, via grooming, or through biting and scratching. Hantaviruses can also spread through the fecal-oral route and across the placenta during pregnancy from mother to child. They can survive for 10 days at room temperature, 15 days in a temperate environment, and more than 18 days at 4 °C (39 °F), which aids in the transmission of the virus. Environmental conditions favorable to the reproduction and spread of rodents are known to increase disease transmission. Living in a rural environment, or in unhygienic settings, and interacting with environments shared with hosts are the biggest risk factors for infection, especially people who are hikers, farmers and forestry workers, as well as those in mining, the military, and zoology.

Rodents can transmit hantaviruses to humans through aerosols or droplets from their excretions and through the consumption of contaminated food. Rodent bites and scratches can also transmit hantaviruses to humans. Researchers often claim that the Andes virus is the only hantavirus that can spread from person to person, usually after coming into close contact with an infected person. It can also reportedly spread through human saliva, airborne droplets, and to newborns through breast milk and the placenta. A systematic review of research, however, found the claims of human-to-human transmission not to be supported by sufficient evidence.

Man-made built environments can facilitate hantavirus transmission. Deforestation and excessive agriculture may destroy rodents' natural habitat. The expansion of agricultural land is associated with a decline in predator populations, which enables hantavirus host species to use farm monocultures as nesting and foraging sites. Agricultural sites built in proximity to rodents' natural habitats can facilitate the proliferation of rodents as they may be attracted to animal feed. Sewers and stormwater drainage systems may be inhabited by rodents, especially in areas with poor solid waste management. Maritime trade and travel have also been implicated in the spread of hantaviruses. Research results are inconsistent on whether urban living increases or decreases hantavirus incidence. Seroprevalence, which shows past infection to hantavirus, is consistently higher in occupations and areas that have greater exposure to rodents. Poor living conditions on battlefields, in military camps, and in refugee camps make soldiers and refugees at great risk of exposure as well.

=== Pathophysiology ===
Infection begins with the interaction of the viral glycoproteins Gn and Gc with β_{3}-integrin receptors on target cell membranes. The main causes of illness are increased vascular permeability, decreased platelet count, and overreaction by the immune system. The virus mainly targets endothelial cells and macrophages. Clusters of virions also cause erroneous platelet aggregation and activation via β_{3}-integrin.

The increased vascular permeability appears to be the result of infected cells producing vascular endothelial growth factor (VEGF), which activate VEGFR2 receptors on endothelial cells, which increases paracellular permeability. Oxygenation problems and bradykinin are also thought to play a role in increased vascular permeability during infection.

Coagulation abnormalities may also occur. Virus particles cluster on the surface of endothelial cells, which causes a misallocation of platelets to infected endothelial cells. Disseminated coagulating without signs of hemorrhaging, major blood clots, and damage to vascular endothelial cells during infection may negatively affect coagulation and platelet levels and promote further vascular leaking and hemorrhaging.

Immature dendritic cells near endothelial cells transport virions from lymphatic vessels to local lymph nodes to infect more endothelial cells. These cells produce antigens to induce an immune response, especially those of macrophages and CD8+ T lymphocytes. After activation of the immune system, cytotoxic T lymphocytes produce pro-inflammatory cytokines that can damage infected endothelial cells, which can lead to increased vascular permeability and inflammatory reactions. These cytokines include interferon (IFN), interleukins (IL-1, IL-6, and IL-10), and tumor necrosis factor-α (TNF-α). Elevated IL-6 levels are associated with low platelet count and renal failure.

HPS mainly affects the heart and lungs, but other parts of the body, such as the nervous system, spleen, and liver, can also be affected. While most major organs become infected, organ failure does not occur in most, as pathology is different from organ to organ. Infected lungs experience inflammation and fluid buildup due to immune cell infiltration and endothelial cell activation. For the same reason, infection of the heart leads to interstitial fluid buildup that contributes to myocardial dysfunction and cardiogenic shock. Liver infection does not lead to significant dysfunction since hepatic blood vessels are already relatively permeable. In the spleen, infection of immune cells can cause over-activation of immature lymphocytes elsewhere and facilitate prolonged spread of the virus throughout the body.

=== Immunology ===
The innate immune system recognizes hantavirus infection by the detection of viral RNA. This triggers production of interferons, immune cytokines, and chemokines and activation of signaling pathways to respond to viral infection. Monocytes respond to infection by using phagocytosis to consume virus particles. IgM antibodies to the viral surface glycoproteins are created to bind to and disable virus particles. During infection, the anti-Gc IgM response is stronger than the anti-Gn IgM response. Long term, the anti-Gc IgG response is stronger than the anti-Gn IgG response. Anti-N antibodies are produced during infection but are not involved in neutralizing virions. Long non-coding RNA and microRNA are involved in inhibiting hantavirus infection.

As described above, transport of virions in the lymphatic system exposes more endothelial cells to the virus and overreaction of the immune system is part of the pathology.

Pathogenic hantaviruses can modify the immune response and evade interferon-mediated antiviral signaling pathways in various ways, including by inhibiting interferon activation, inhibiting the activation of transcription factors, and inhibiting downstream JAK/STAT signaling. They can also regulate cell death to aid in completing their life cycle through autophagy, apoptosis, and pyroptosis. Hantaan virus infection and NP and GP protein expression have been shown to promote the production of microRNAs that reduce the expression of pro-inflammatory cytokines. Furthermore, hantaviruses appear to induce cell stress via endoplasmic reticulum stress while inhibiting the cellular response to stress, which helps the virus escape host stress signaling.

== Prevention ==
Reducing the risk of exposure to rodents at home, one's workplace, and when camping prevents hantavirus infection. Rodent control methods such as rodenticides, traps, and cats have been proposed as ways to control the rodent population. Preventing rodents from entering one's house, removing potential nesting sites around one's house, covering trash cans, cutting grass, and installing public warning signs in endemic areas can help to reduce contact with rodents and their excretions. In addition, spraying water before activities can help reduce the generation of dust.

Cleaning and disinfecting human living spaces by removing rodent food sources can prevent the contamination of food and other items with hantaviruses from rodent excretions and secretions. Hantaviruses can be inactivated by heating them at 60 °C (140 °F) for 30 minutes, or by exposing them to organic solvents, hypochlorite (bleach) solutions, household disinfectant, or ultraviolet light (including sunlight). Sweeping and vacuuming should be avoided as there is a risk of aerosolizing the excretions.

People at high risk of infection, including pest exterminators and people who work in agriculture, forestry, and animal husbandry can take preventive measures to prevent exposure to hantaviruses. Rubber or plastic gloves should be worn during cleanup and disinfection of wild rodent excretions and corpses. It is also advised to ventilate the room before entering and to wear a respirator. Heavy infestations should be handled wearing more complete personal protective equipment: disposable coveralls (if possible), rubber boots or disposable shoe covers, rubber/latex/vinyl gloves, protective goggles, and a HEPA respirator (either the negative-pressure/air-purifying half-mask or the powered respirator).

Pet rodents should be kept away from wild rodents. New pets should be tested for hantavirus. Pet rodent items should be cleaned as often as human items; gloving is not required if the rodent is not infected.

== Diagnosis ==
Initial diagnosis of hantavirus infection can be made based on epidemiological information and clinical symptoms. Infection can be confirmed through the detection of hantavirus nucleic acid, proteins, or hantavirus-specific antibodies. Key laboratory findings include thrombocytopenia, leukocytosis, hemoconcentration, elevated serum creatinine levels, hematuria, and proteinuria. Hantavirus-specific IgM and IgG antibodies are usually present at the onset of symptoms. IgM is detectable in the acute phase of infection but declines over a period of 2–6 months. The response of IgG antibodies is low during infection but grows over time and lasts for one's lifetime.

Neutralization tests, immunofluorescent assays (IFAs), and enzyme-linked immunosorbent assays (ELISAs) can be used to detect antibodies to hantavirus infection in blood, usually anti-N or anti-Gc antibodies. ELISA is inexpensive and can be used at any point during the illness, but results may need to be confirmed by other methods. Rapid immunochromatographic IgM antibody tests can also be used for diagnosis as they are simple to carry out and inexpensive. Western blotting can detect hantavirus antigen in tissue samples, but is costly and time-consuming.

Both traditional and real-time polymerase chain reaction (PCR) tests of blood, saliva, BAL fluids, and tissue samples can be used. There is a possibility of false negatives with PCR if there are low levels of virus particles in the blood, and PCR testing is prone to cross-contamination. When performed during the onset of infection, PCR may predict disease severity. PCR can be used for postmortem diagnosis and for analysis of organ involvement, and it can be used to sequence the virus's genome to identify which specific virus is causing illness.

== Management ==
Supportive treatment is always performed for HPS. The specific treatment depends on the disease phase and clinical presentation. Treatment entails continual cardiac monitoring and respiratory support, including mechanical ventilation, extracorporeal membrane oxygenation (ECMO), and hemofiltration. If HPS is suspected, then a person may be preemptively prepared for ECMO upon hospital arrival. Since high nAb titers are associated with favorable outcomes, fresh frozen plasma and sera from recovered individuals has been used to treat HPS and lower the case fatality rate. No specific antiviral drugs exist for hantavirus infection, but ribavirin and favipiravir have shown varying efficacy and safety.

Prophylactic use of ribavirin and favipiravir in early infection or post-exposure shows some efficacy, and both have shown some anti-hantavirus activity in vivo and in vitro. Ribavirin is effective in the early treatment of HFRS with some limitations, such as toxicity at high doses and the potential to cause hemolytic anemia. Anemia is reversible upon completion of ribavirin treatment. In some instances, ribavirin may cause excess bilirubin in the blood (hyperbilirubinemia), abnormally slow heartbeat (sinus bradycardia), and rashes. The administration of ribavirin after the onset of the cardiopulmonary phase of HPS has not been shown to be an effective treatment and currently there is no recommendation for the use of ribavirin to treat HFRS or HPS.

Favipiravir, in comparison to ribavirin, has shown greater efficacy without anemia as a side effect. In hamster models, oral administration of favipiravir twice per day of 100 mg/kg significantly reduced viral load in the blood and antigen load in the lungs. Oral administration before viremia prevented HPS, but not after this. Several other approaches have been researched as potential anti-hantavirus treatments, including small-molecule compounds that target the virus or host, peptides, alligator weed, antibodies, and classical antiviral drugs, tested mainly to block hantavirus entry into cells or restrain virus replication. Host-targeting medicines are designed to improve vascular function or rebuild homeostasis.

== Prognosis ==
The prognosis for HPS is often poor. The case fatality rate of HPS ranges from 30% to 60%. Death usually occurs 2–10 days after the onset of illness and occurs suddenly during the cardiopulmonary phase of illness. Andes virus infection has a case fatality rate of about 40%, and Sin Nombre virus a case fatality rate of 30–35%. It typically takes a few months to recover from illness fully. Difficulties with breathing, however, can persist for up to two years.

The antibody response to hantavirus infection is strong and long-lasting. Early production of neutralizing antibodies (nAbs) that target the surface glycoproteins is directly associated with increased likelihood of survival. High nAb counts can be detected as long as ten years after infection. Higher levels of IL-6, in contrast, are associated with more severe disease, and deceased individuals have higher IL-6 levels than survivors. Genetic susceptibility to severe illness is related to one's human leukocyte antigen (HLA) type, which also depends on the hantavirus, as increased susceptibility to different hantaviruses is associated with different HLA haplogroups.

== Epidemiology ==
Most cases of HPS are caused by just two viruses: the Andes virus and the Sin Nombre virus. The Andes virus is carried primarily by the long-tailed pygmy rice rat (Oligoryzomys longicaudatus) and the Sin Nombre virus by the western deer mouse (Peromyscus sonoriensis). The Andes virus is mainly found in Argentina, Brazil, and Chile, where it causes more than one hundred cases annually. In North America, Sin Nombre virus causes dozens of cases each year. Overall, there are a few hundred cases of HPS every year. The geographic distribution of individual hantaviruses is directly tied to the geographic distribution of their natural reservoir. In the US and Canada, most cases occur in the west. Individual cases and small clusters of HPS have been reported in Europe and Turkey.

=== Environment ===
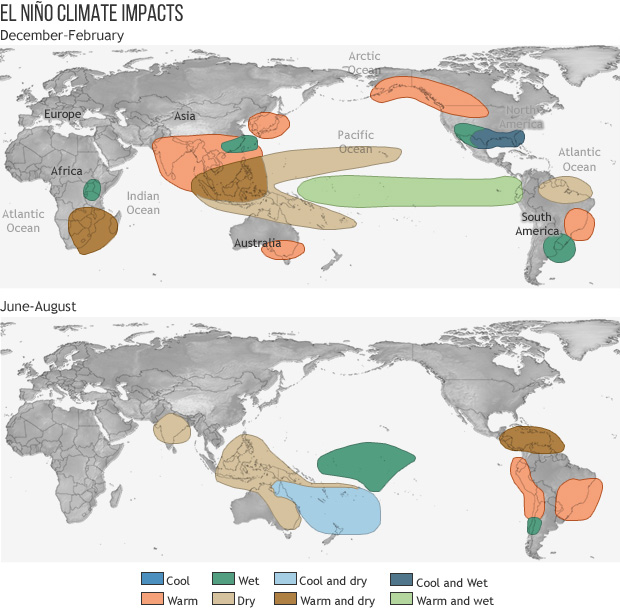
El Niño's effect on local climates

Rodent species that carry hantaviruses inhabit a diverse range of habitats, including desert-like biomes, equatorial and tropical forests, swamps, savannas, fields, and salt marshes. The seroprevalence of hantaviruses in their host species has been observed to range from 5.9% to 38% in the Americas, and 3% to about 19% worldwide, depending on testing method and location. In some places, such as South Korea, routine trapping of wild rodents is performed to surveil hantavirus circulation.

Climate change and environmental degradation increase contact areas between rodent hosts and humans, which increases potential exposure to hantaviruses. An example of this was the 1993 Four Corners outbreak in the United States, which was immediately preceded by elevated rainfall from the 1992–1993 El Niño warming period. This caused a substantial growth in the food supply for rodents, which led to rapid growth in their population and facilitated greater spread of the hantavirus that caused that outbreak.

Rainfall is consistently associated with hantavirus incidence in various patterns. Heavy rainfall is a risk factor for outbreaks in the following months, but may negatively affect incidence by flooding rodent burrows and nests. In places that have wet and dry seasons, infections are more common in the wet season than in the dry season. Low rainfall and drought are associated with decreased incidence since such conditions result in a smaller rodent population, but displacement of rodent populations via drought or flood can lead to an increase in rodent-human interactions and infections.

Temperature has varying effects on hantavirus transmission. Higher temperatures create unfavorable environments for virus survival and decrease activity levels of Neotropic rodents, but can cause rodents to seek shelter from heat in human settings, and are beneficial for aerosol production. Lower temperatures can prolong virus survival outside a host. Extreme temperatures, whether hot or cold, are associated with lower disease incidence. High humidity can benefit rodent populations in warm climates, where it may positively impact plant growth and thus food availability for rodents.

== History ==
In 1993, an outbreak of highly lethal ARDS occurred in the Four Corners region of the United States. This outbreak was determined to be caused by a hantavirus, now named Sin Nombre virus, and represented the first confirmed instance of hantaviruses endemic to the Americas that could cause disease, as well as the discovery of a new type of disease caused by hantaviruses. Following the outbreak, the new disease was named "hantavirus pulmonary syndrome". During subsequent years, many additional hantaviruses that cause HPS were discovered in the Americas. Andes virus was identified in 1995. Human-to-human transmission of Andes virus was first reported in an outbreak in 1996 in El Bolsón, Argentina. Since then, sporadic outbreaks with reported person-to-person transmission have occurred. In 2026, Andes virus was responsible for an outbreak aboard the MV Hondius while the ship was at sea.

== Notable cases ==
- 1993 Four Corners hantavirus outbreak
- 2012 Yosemite hantavirus outbreak
- In February 2025, Betsy Arakawa, the wife of actor Gene Hackman, died from the illness.
- 2026 MV Hondius hantavirus outbreak

== See also ==
- Hantavirus hemorrhagic fever with renal syndrome
