= Effects of climate change on hantavirus =

Orthohantaviruses (human hantaviruses) primarily transmit through contact with infected rodents, posing significant public health risks, specifically with hantavirus pulmonary syndrome (HPS), in Latin America and the Caribbean (LAC) where biodiversity is high. Notably, rodent species like those in the Cricetidae family serve as reservoirs for various hantavirus strains, including the Andes virus (ANDV), which uniquely transmits between humans. Climate change, with its effects on rainfall, temperature, and extreme weather patterns, is increasingly altering environmental conditions in these regions, amplifying rodent population dynamics and thus the potential for hantavirus outbreaks.

== Hantavirus dynamics in Latin America and the Caribbean ==
In Latin America and the Caribbean (LAC), where biodiversity of rodents may be high, rodent species (like those from the Cricetidae family) act as major reservoirs for hantaviruses. These regions also face the challenge of distinguishing hantavirus infections from other endemic diseases with similar symptoms, such as dengue and Zika. Notable hantavirus strains in LAC include the Andes virus (ANDV), which is capable of human-to-human transmission, and Laguna Negra virus (LANV). The diversity of hantavirus species in South America is among the highest globally, influenced by the distribution of various rodent species that thrive in disturbed ecosystems, such as agricultural lands.

All hantaviruses are closely linked to specific mammalian hosts with which they've co-evolved, initially thought to be limited to rodents like rats, mice, and voles. Recently, insectivores such as shrews and moles have also been identified as hosts.

Hantavirus transmission varies significantly among species. Unlike other members of the Bunyaviridae family, hantaviruses do not have arthropod vectors. Some, like the Sin Nombre virus (SNV), spread only through direct contact with infected body fluids, often during aggressive behavior or grooming. Others, such as Puumala, Seoul, and Hantaan viruses, can also spread indirectly through inhalation of contaminated rodent excreta.

Climate and environmental changes significantly impact hantavirus transmission by altering rodent population dynamics. In LAC, intense hydrometeorological events linked to climate change are predicted to further exacerbate these risks, especially as rodent habitats expand into human environments. Consequently, understanding the relationship between climate factors and hantavirus transmission is crucial for preparing public health responses in these regions.

Excess moisture creates favorable conditions for rodents in human areas by, flooding their natural habitats, driving them to seek shelter in urban spaces. On the flip side, droughts can also force rodents out of arid environments in search of water and food in human settlements. Cities experience higher temperatures due to urban heat island effects, making them more hospitable to rodents seeking warmer conditions. All of the above encourages their migration into human environments.

== Ecosystem distributions ==
Climate change disrupts the ecosystem especially concerning hantavirus epidemiology. The impacts of climate change are shown in events such as altered precipitation patterns and shifts in water cycles. In warmer water climates the rodent populations tend to increase along with food and shelter becoming accessible. These rodents are the primary hosts of hantavirus and can then spread the virus more quickly. Recent studies suggest that climate change not only alters habitat suitability but also shifts biodiversity in ways that favor reservoir species carrying hantaviruses. A 2025 review found that milder winters, increased mast events (periods of heavy tree seed production), and the loss of small-mammal diversity are contributing to higher orthohantavirus prevalence and an expanded geographic risk range in Europe. Climatic factors such as rainfall and temperature impact rodent population density, with milder winters and increased food sources contributing to population booms that can elevate the risk of hantavirus transmission to humans.

Climate change can lead to increased agricultural activities and deforestation. These events directly affects the habitats of rodents which results in them being forced to move to areas closer to human settlements. For example as forests are cleared for agriculture, rodents that lived there are forced to move into human homes and structures. This leads to a higher risk of Hantavirus transmission as people are more likely to come into contact with infected rodent dropping, urine, or saliva.

Increased frequency of extreme weather events, such as floods and droughts, also alters the availability of resources for rodents. These disturbances further push rodents toward urban and peri-urban areas, increasing the chances of contact with humans. Essentially, the disruption of natural ecosystems by climate change creates a more favorable environment for rodent populations and their diseases, like Hantavirus, to thrive.

Climate change does not just affect the climate in a direct sense; it transforms entire ecosystems, altering the habitats of disease vectors like rodents, changing patterns of disease transmission, and raising the risk of zoonotic infections like Hantavirus. Addressing climate change, deforestation, and unsustainable agricultural practices is crucial for controlling the spread of such diseases.

== Zoonotic spillover events ==
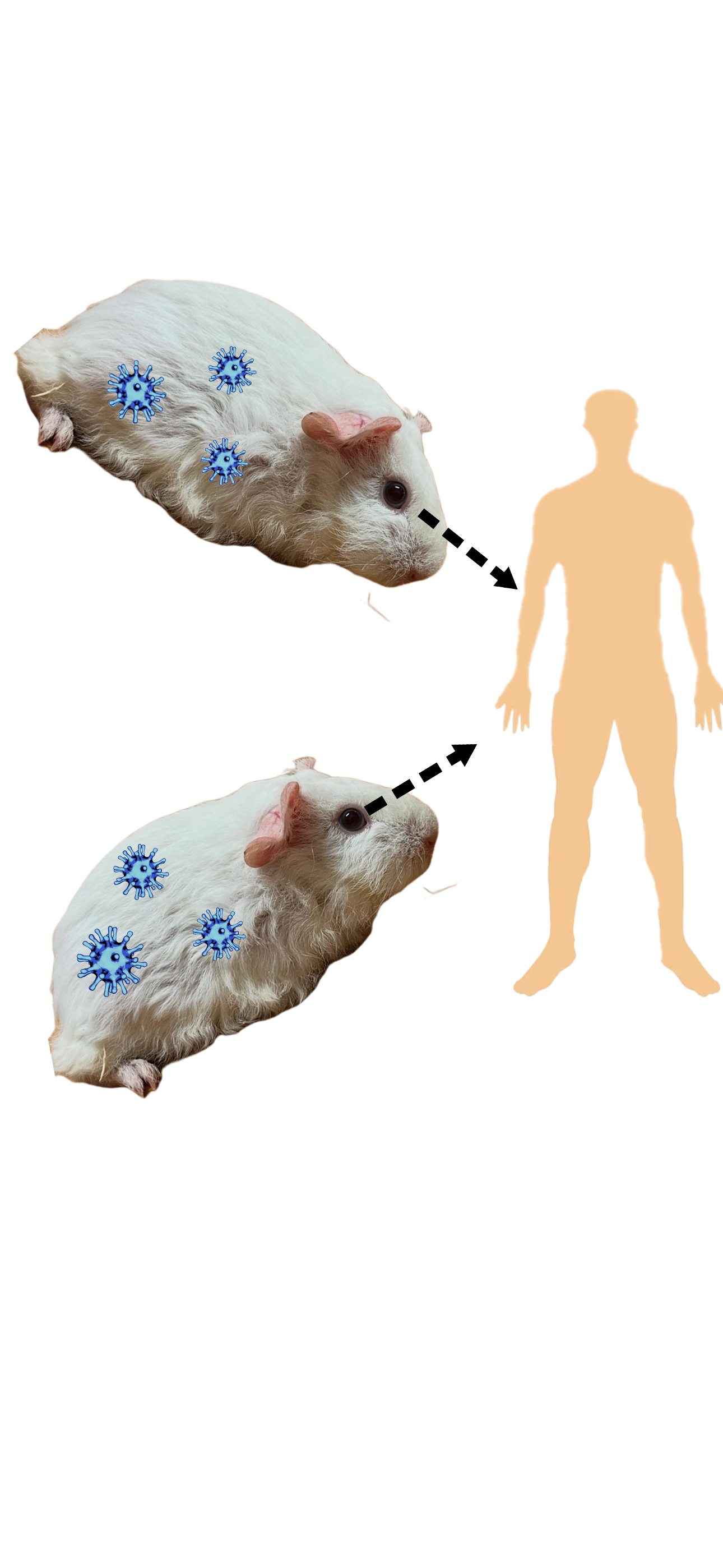
Zoonotic spillover

=== Interactions between humans and rodents carrying hantavirus ===
Changes in land use, such as deforestation, agricultural expansion, and urbanization, increase human contact with rodent habitats, amplifying exposure risk. Occupational and recreational activities in rural areas also heighten exposure risks.

Climate change leads to an altered precipitation of warmer temperature patterns, this results in a boost in vegetation growth and availability of food sources for rodents. An example of this is that higher perception can support more robust crop and grass growth which causes an increase in food supply and supports larger rodent populations. Studies have shown that an increase in food availability leads to higher rodent reproduction rates and population. This particularly happens in periods of increased rainfall and warmer winters as well as breeding seasons, rodents having higher survival in the winter and warmer temperatures contributes to the longer breeding seasons as well as improved survival rates among these rodents. Evidently this increases the numbers of hantavirus carrying rodents and a greater risk of human exposure through contact with droppings, saliva and nesting materials.

Climate zones shifting due to the rapid warming temperatures are causing rodents to migrate into previously inhospitable areas, often closer to human settlements. For example increased temperatures at higher altitudes allow rodents to expand into regions where they were previously rare to be spotting but now have turned into a hotspot for potential zoonotic transmission of hantavirus.

Climate change has generated shifts in land use, including agricultural expansion into areas which were previously unused, overlapping with rodent habitats. Farmland expansions into the natural habitats of rodents increase the transmission of hantavirus. Studies in Brazil and Argentina indicate that increased agricultural activity in rodent habitat correlates with higher hantavirus infection rates among nearby human populations. Rodents are increasingly drawn to cities where food and shelter are more accessible, this means an influx of rodents are approaching urban areas, all rodents migrating to urban areas allows rodents to thrive in close proximity to humans thus raising spillover risks.

=== Seasonality ===
Hantavirus outbreaks often exhibit seasonal patterns, aligning with periods when rodent activity peaks. For example, spring and summer typically see increased cases in temperate regions as rodent populations and human outdoor activities both surge.

Climate change increase the likelihood of zoonotic spillover infection of Hantavirus from rodents to humans by causing droughts, floods, and wildfires have resulted in the displacement of both rodents and humans from their natural habitat. Rodents often relocate to human occupied areas in search of shelter and food, resulting in the increase of hantavirus spillover into human populations. Rodents enter homes, farms, schools, and any areas humans typically reside, causing the risk of hantavirus transmission to be amplified.

Climate change is known to alter the replication and transmission dynamics of the causative virus in rodents. A 2021 research discovered that altered conditions caused by climate change, such as increased precipitation and vegetation growth, were positively linked to Andes virus outbreaks in South America. Molecular studies performed in 2021 show that changes to the local ecology induced by these attributes could influence the evolution and endemicity of the Andes virus in South America.

Extreme weather events such as prolonged droughts, intense storms, and temperature rising drives not only rodents but also humans to abundant resources. Both rodents and humans drawn to the same resources amplifies the likelihood of hantavirus transmission in these regions. During droughts rodents may congregate and scare water sources also used by humans, this creates a high contact area, likely to transmit hantavirus through water. Temperature and humidity levels rising can make hantavirus survive longer outside of the host. Rodent droppings and nesting materials are warm, if the temperature is warm and keeps rising the resting materials will be able to stay long therefore allowing the virus to stay alive longer. Moist environments also allow the virus to remain infectious longer. All of these factors increase the risk of exposure for humans in affected areas. Particularly following extreme weather events that disturb natural rodent habitats forcing relocation.

== Population focus ==
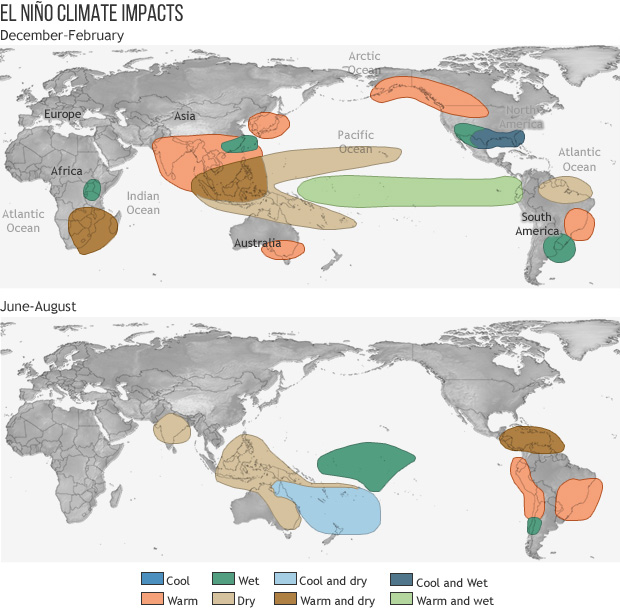
El Niño's effect on local climates

Climate change is expected to influence hantavirus outbreaks by impacting the populations of rodent hosts that carry the virus. Changes in temperature, rainfall, and food availability can cause fluctuations in rodent population densities, affecting the frequency and geographic spread of hantaviruses. For example, elevated temperatures in West-Central Europe have been linked to increased outbreaks of Puumala hantavirus, driven by higher seed production and bank vole population growth. Similarly, the 1993 hantavirus outbreak in the U.S. Four Corners region followed a 20-fold increase in rodent populations due to increased rainfall from the 1992–1993 El Niño, illustrating how climate-related factors can amplify hantavirus risks.

=== El Niño's effect on carrier populations ===
ENSO, a climate phenomenon that alternates between warmer El Niño and cooler La Niña phases, disrupts global weather patterns, influencing rainfall, drought, and temperature fluctuations. During El Niño events, warmer sea surface temperatures shift weather patterns, increasing rainfall in some regions like South America and East Africa while causing droughts in areas such as Southeast Asia and Australia. Global warming is expected to further intensify these climate anomalies, potentially increasing the frequency and severity of ENSO events.

In the southwestern United States, the 1993 hantavirus outbreak serves as a prime example of how ENSO can exacerbate disease risks. Unusual rains followed by drought led to a surge in the deer mouse population, which transmits hantavirus through excretions that humans can inhale, resulting in the often fatal hantavirus pulmonary syndrome (HPS). ENSO-driven rainfall increases food sources for rodents, indirectly raising the risk of human exposure to hantavirus.

Rodents exhibit seasonal breeding patterns, sensitive to prolonged breeding seasons caused by warmer temperatures during ENSO. Rodent numbers tend to peak in winter after heavy ENSO precipitation, with increased hantavirus prevalence in the year following the event. Hantavirus-positive rodents increased in the year after ENSO events, with higher infection rates in areas with dense vegetation. Human Cases of Hantavirus increase the year after an ENSO event, coinciding with elevated rodent populations. Studies link ENSO events with a rise in human hantavirus cases, especially in the year following the event.
