= Limestone Canyon virus =

Virus classification
- (unranked): Virus
- Realm: Riboviria
- Kingdom: Orthornavirae
- Phylum: Negarnaviricota
- Class: Bunyaviricetes
- Order: Elliovirales
- Family: Hantaviridae
- Genus: Orthohantavirus (?)
- Virus: Limestone Canyon virus

Species of virus

Limestone Canyon virus (LSC) is a single-stranded, negative-sense RNA zoonotic Orthohantavirus that is genetically similar to Sin Nombre orthohantavirus which causes Hantavirus pulmonary syndrome (HPS) in humans. HPS causing hantaviruses are found only in the United States and South America.

LSC has not been shown to cause HPS in humans.

== Reservoir ==
The virus was isolated from the brush mouse (Peromyscus boylii). Phylogenetic analysis of M genome segment showed LSC to be very distinct from other Peromyscus-borne viruses. Other Peromyscus-associated hantaviruses include Sin Nombre orthohantavirus (SNV), New York orthohantavirus (NYV), and Monongahela virus (MGLV).

== See also ==
- 1993 Four Corners hantavirus outbreak
