= Langley Fox Building Partnership v De Valence =

South African legal case

In Langley Fox Building Partnership (Pty) Ltd v De Valence, an important case in South African law, the Supreme Court of Appeal once more affirmed that a duty cast upon a defendant might be such that it is discharged only if reasonable precautions to avoid the harm are actually taken, and that the defendant who appoints another to take those steps, and fails to do so, will be liable for the failure, although it was careful to emphasise that Stratford ACJ did not purport to say that "there might be liability as an invariable rule whenever the work entails danger to the public." Goldstone AJA said that "the correct approach to the liability of an employer for the negligence of an independent contractor is to apply the fundamental rule that obliges a person to exercise that degree of care which the circumstances demand."

The respondent cross-appealed, claiming that she should have been awarded damages in the amount of R593 070. Goldstone AJA found on the appeal, "in all the circumstances," that "the learned trial Judge correctly held the appellant liable to compensate the respondent for the damages sustained by her." The cross-appeal was also upheld.

== Original case ==
De Valence v Langley Fox Building Partnership (Pty) Ltd is an important case in South African law, heard by the Witwatersrand Local Division. On 13 August 1982, the respondent, Mrs Patricia Poupinel de Valence, was a successful audiometrician. She conducted a private practice in partnership with a Mr Carter. On that day she was walking on a sidewalk outside Hunt's Corner, a building situate in the central business district of Johannesburg. A wooden beam had been suspended between two trestles at right-angles across the sidewalk. The respondent struck the left side of her forehead against the beam. At first the injury caused thereby was thought to have been minor. However, it had the most serious and unfortunate consequences for the respondent.

Van Schalkwyk J held that the appellant, Langley Fox Building Partnership (Pty) Ltd, was negligent in relation to the erection of the wooden beam and he ordered it to pay damages to the respondent in the amount of R181 408,45 and the costs of suit.

== Appeal ==
Langley Fox was another case in which the defendant employed an independent contractor to do work on its behalf. The majority of the court held that the defendant should have realised that the work was inherently dangerous, and that he was under a duty to take reasonable steps to guard against the danger. Nugent JA, in Chartaprops 16 (Pty) Ltd and Another v Silberman, thought it "clear from the following passage that the majority [in Langley Fox] considered that duty to require the defendant to ensure that adequate precautions were taken," and that, in that passage, it held the defendant liable because they were not taken. The passage reads as follows:

Whether such precautions were to be taken by the [defendant] or the contractor, as between them, is a matter depending on their contract. As far as the duty to the public in general and the [plaintiff] in particular is concerned it matters not. That duty rested upon the [defendant].

Langley Fox acknowledged the general rule of no liability of a principal for the civil wrongs of an independent contractor except where the principal was personally at fault. The test for negligence in a case such as this, consonant with the classic test for culpa laid down in Kruger v Coetzee, was set out by Goldstone AJA as follows:

(a) would a reasonable man have foreseen the risk of danger in consequence of the work he employed the contractor to perform? If so,

(b) would a reasonable man have taken steps to guard against the danger? If so,

(c) were such steps duly taken in the case in question?

In determining the answer to the second enquiry into negligence, Goldstone AJA emphasised the following, albeit by no means exhaustive, list of factors:

the nature of the danger; the context in which the danger may arise; the degree of expertise available to the employer and the independent contractor respectively; and the means available to the employer to avert the danger.

Applying this test of negligence to the facts, Goldstone AJA held that it was foreseeable to a reasonable person in the position of Langley Fox that the workmen erecting the ceiling would require some form of construction to raise it above the level of the sidewalk, as an obstruction of such a nature would necessarily constitute a source of serious potential danger to pedestrians using the sidewalk. Accordingly, "to place it there, and no more, was an inherently dangerous act," and the economic cost of the wrong should be borne by the legal entity immediately responsible for it.

== See also ==
- South African agency law
