= Robert Breiman =

American epidemiologist

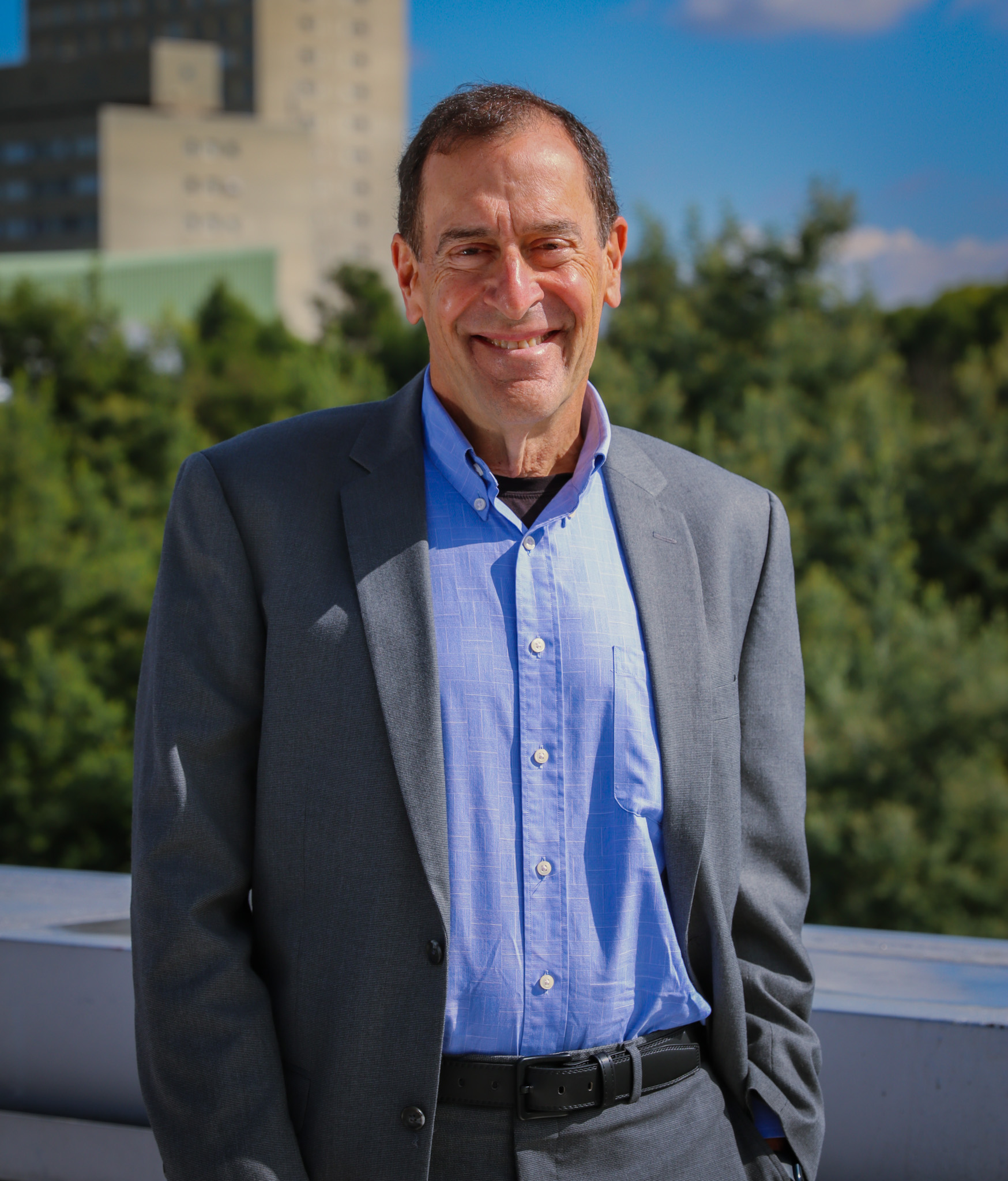
- Born: Robert Fredric Breiman
- Education: University of Arizona (BA, MD)
- Known for: Hantavirus pulmonary syndrome discovery; Nipah virus investigations
- Scientific career
- Fields: Epidemiology, Infectious disease, Global health
- Institutions: Emory University; University of the Witwatersrand; Centers for Disease Control and Prevention

Robert Fredric Breiman is an American epidemiologist and physician who is a professor of Global Health at Emory University and a Distinguished Professor at the University of the Witwatersrand. In 2017, he was elected to the U.S. National Academy of Medicine.

== Education ==
Breiman attended the University of Arizona, graduating in 1975 and earning his Medical Degree in 1979. He completed his internship, residency, and chief residency in Internal Medicine at the University of California, Los Angeles (UCLA) San Fernando Valley Medical Program between 1979 and 1983, and an infectious diseases fellowship at UCLA from 1984 to 1987.

== Career ==
=== Centers for Disease Control and Prevention (1987–2013) ===
In 1987, Breiman joined the CDC as an Epidemic Intelligence Service (EIS) officer in the Respiratory Diseases Branch. From 1989 to 1997, he served as Chief of the Respiratory Diseases Epidemiology Section. During this period, he led the investigation of the first recognized outbreak of Hantavirus pulmonary syndrome in the Four Corners region of the United States in 1993, including the identification of the Sin Nombre virus. From 1995 to 2000, he also served as Director of the United States National Vaccine Program Office within the United States Department of Health and Human Services.

=== International leadership (2000–present) ===
From 2000 to 2004, Breiman was the Director of the Health Systems and Infectious Diseases Division at the ICDDR,B (Centre for Health and Population Research) in Dhaka, Bangladesh. While in Bangladesh, he led outbreak investigations for Nipah virus encephalitis.

He subsequently joined CDC-Kenya, serving as the Head of the Global Disease Detection Division from 2004 to 2012 and the Country Director for CDC-Kenya from 2010 to 2013 in Nairobi. His work in Kenya included leading responses to outbreaks of Rift Valley fever, Chikungunya, and Avian influenza.

=== Academic appointments (2013–Present) ===
Breiman joined Emory University in 2013 as the Director of the Emory Global Health Institute, a position he held until 2019. He is a Tenured professor of Global Health in the Hubert Department of Global Health at the Rollins School of Public Health.

He also holds the position of Distinguished Professor at the University of the Witwatersrand in South Africa. From 2022 to 2025, he served as the Interim Director of the Infectious Diseases and Oncology Research Institute (IDORI) at the University of the Witwatersrand, where he is currently a Senior Scientific Advisor.

== Research work ==
A central theme of Breiman's research and programmatic work has been the documentation of, and response to, inequities in infectious disease incidence and mortality, particularly in sub-Saharan Africa and South Asia. His research focuses on the epidemiology, prevention, and control of infectious diseases, with particular emphasis on emerging infectious diseases, vaccine-preventable diseases, and public health surveillance in low- and middle-income countries. A key component of this work has been the use of population-based surveillance systems to quantify disease burden, characterize disparities, and evaluate interventions aimed at reducing preventable illness and death in low-income regions and resource-limited communities.

His work has integrated field epidemiology, clinical investigation, and population-based surveillance to examine disparities in the incidence and mortality of high-burden diseases and to inform disease control strategies and global health policy. He designed and led long-term population-based infectious disease surveillance systems in both an urban informal settlement in Nairobi and a rural community in western Kenya (Siaya County). Over more than two decades, these surveillance platforms have produced data used by governments and partner organizations to prioritize diseases for public health action and to evaluate interventions addressing infectious diseases—including typhoid fever and other enteric diseases, pneumococcal disease, influenza, other respiratory infections, and malaria—as well as selected non-communicable diseases such as malnutrition, hypertension, and burn injuries.

A central area of Breiman's research has been the investigation of emerging infectious diseases. While at the Centers for Disease Control and Prevention, he played a leading role in identifying and characterizing Hantavirus pulmonary syndrome during the 1993 outbreak in the Four Corners region of the United States, including the identification of the Sin Nombre virus. He later contributed to international outbreak investigations of Nipah virus encephalitis in Bangladesh and served as a World Health Organization team lead during the SARS outbreak in China in 2003. His research in East Africa included studies of Rift Valley fever, Chikungunya, and avian influenza.

Breiman has conducted extensive research on vaccine-preventable diseases and immunization programs. His studies have addressed pneumococcal disease, influenza, rotavirus, typhoid fever, and cholera, including evaluations of vaccine effectiveness and disease burden. His work has informed recommendations by the World Health Organization and national health authorities, and he has chaired expert groups focused on typhoid disease burden estimation and vaccine policy.

Another major focus of Breiman's research has been child mortality surveillance. From 2015 to 2020, he served as Principal Investigator of the Child Health and Mortality Prevention Surveillance (CHAMPS) network, a multinational surveillance program designed to determine causes of death among children under five years of age in regions with high mortality.

== Honors and awards ==
- 1989: Gordon C. Mackel Award, Centers for Disease Control and Prevention
- 1993: HHS Secretary's Award for Distinguished Service, United States Department of Health and Human Services
- 1996: Public Health Service Outstanding Service Medal
- 1996: Fellow, Infectious Diseases Society of America
- 2017: Elected Member, National Academy of Medicine
- 2017: Fellow, American Society of Tropical Medicine and Hygiene (FASTMH)
- 2024: Fellow, Wits MIND Institute
