= Compass Motors Industries v Callguard =

South African legal case

In Compass Motors Industries (Pty) Ltd v. Callguard (Pty) Ltd, an important case in South African law, Van Zyl, J. expressed the opinion, obiter, that a security firm that had contracted to guard a premises had a legal duty to third parties to guard vehicles lawfully parked on the premises.

== See also ==
- South African agency law
