= Chartaprops v Silberman =

2008 case in South African law

- Court: Supreme Court of Appeal
- Full case name: Chartaprops 16 (Pty) Ltd and Another v Silberman
- Decided: 25 September 2008
- Citation: 2009 (1) SA 265 (SCA)

Case history
- Appealed from: Witwatersrand Local Division

Court membership
- Judges sitting: Scott JA, Nugent JA, Ponnan JA, Maya JA and Leach AJA

Case opinions
- Nugent JA, Ponnan JA
- Decision by: Ponnan JA

Keywords
- Principal, agent, liability, independent contractor, employment, negligence, non-delegable duty, care, damages, delict, reasonableness, foreseeability, harm, vicarious liability

Chartaprops 16 (Pty) Ltd and Another v Silberman is an important case in the South African law of agency. It was heard in the Supreme Court of Appeal by Scott JA, Nugent JA, Ponnan JA, Maya JA and Leach AJA on May 14, 2008. They delivered judgment on September 25. The case was an appeal from a decision in the Witwatersrand Local Division by Boruchowitz J.

== Facts ==
The respondent sued the appellants out of the High Court for her damages suffered as a result of injuries sustained when she slipped and fell in a shopping mall owned by the first appellant and cleaned by the second appellant. The respondent alleged that the second appellant was negligent in failing to detect and remove the spillage in the passage, and that the first appellant was vicariously liable for the negligence of the second appellant. At the conclusion of the trial, the High Court held that the appellants were jointly and severally liable to the respondent. The appellants appealed against that decision to the Supreme Court of Appeal.

== Judgment ==
The SCA held that the general rule was that a principal was not liable for the wrongs committed by an independent contractor or its employees. The courts have, however, been extending the principal's liability for the acts of independent contractors: a tendency which, if unchecked, would result in the creation of vicarious responsibility for every act of negligence performed by an independent contractor in the course of doing the work, thus effacing the distinction between principal and independent contractor.

The court held, further, that the concept of a non-delegable or "personal" duty had been designed to enable a plaintiff to outflank the general rule as stated above. The problem was that the classification in any particular circumstances of a duty as non-delegable amounted to an assertion without rational backing. The correct approach to the liability of a principal for the negligence of an independent contractor was to apply the fundamental rule that obliged everyone to exercise that degree of care that the circumstances demanded. That meant that, given that the first appellant's duty was to take care that the premises were safe, it was obliged to take no more than reasonable steps to guard against foreseeable harm to the public.

The court found that, by engaging a competent contractor, the first appellant took the care which was incumbent on it to make the premises reasonably safe. There was no way for the first appellant to have known that the second appellant's work would be defective. The first appellant had therefore not been negligent, and the damage complained of was caused solely by the negligent act or omission of the second appellant.

The SCA held, accordingly, that the court a quo had erred in holding the first appellant liable. Its finding in relation to the second appellant could, however, not be faulted. The appeal was thus upheld in part and dismissed in part.

== See also ==
- South African agency law
