= Joel Melamed and Hurwitz v Cleveland Estates =

South African legal case

In Joel Melamed and Hurwitz v Cleveland Estates (Pty) Ltd; Joel Melamed and Hurwitz v Vorner Investments (Pty) Ltd, Joel Melamed and Hurwitz was a firm of attorneys. The senior partner, Joel Melamed, and his partner, Hurwitz, held financial interests in certain townships which were in the process of being established and exploited. In 1961, Melamed met Harry Galaun who, through the defendant companies, was interested in certain land and sought the firm's advice. The firm, through a separate company, TMC, was appointed as the management company of the township development of Galaun. This appointment was terminated in 1979. Joel Melamed and Hurwitz claimed damages based on the fees they would have earned from the conveyancing work had the appointment not been allegedly unlawfully terminated.

The crux of the main cause of action was that Melamed alleged to have contracted with himself in two different capacities: i.e. as a partner in the firm of attorneys and as managing director of TMC.

On the question of whether a person may, as representative of another, contract with himself, either in his personal capacity or as representative of a third person, the court held that it was legally competent for Melamed, in his capacity as managing director of TMC, to make a contract with himself, in his other capacity as partner in the firm of attorneys, in terms whereof the latter was appointed as conveyancer for all the erven in the townships.

The court held that the mere description of a relationship as one of agency is not sufficient; one must look to the substance of the relationship.

Further it was held, the test for which a tacit contract may be ascertained is a process of inference whereby the most plausible conclusion in the factual context will be the contract coming into existence.

== See also ==
- Law of agency in South Africa
