= Peri-Urban Areas Health Board v Munarin =

South African legal case

In Peri-Urban Areas Health Board v Munarin, an important case in South African law, the issue concerned the liability of the employer of an independent contractor for damages arising from the death of a third party who was injured in consequence of the dangerous operations being performed by the contractor. In the course of his judgment, in terms of which the employer's liability was confirmed, Holmes JA said,

Negligence is the breach of a duty of care. In general, the law allows me to mind my own business. Thus, if I happen to see someone else's child about to drown in a pool, ordinarily I do not owe a legal duty to anyone to try to save it. But sometimes the law requires me to be my brother's keeper. This happens, for example, when the circumstances are such that I owe him a duty of care; and I am negligent if I breach it. I owe him such a duty if a diligens paterfamilias, that notional epitome of reasonable prudence, in the position in which I am in [sic], would—

(a) foresee the possibility of harm occurring to him; and

(b) take steps to guard against its occurrence.

Foreseeability of harm to a person, whether he be a specific individual or one of a category, is usually not a difficult question, but when ought I to guard against it? It depends upon the circumstances in each particular case, and it is neither necessary nor desirable to attempt a formulation which would cover all cases. For the purposes of the present case it is sufficient to say, by way of general approach, that if I launch a potentially dangerous undertaking involving the foreseeable possibility of harm to another, the circumstances may be such that I cannot reasonably shrug my shoulders in unconcern but have certain responsibilities in the matter—the duty of care.

== See also ==
- South African agency law
