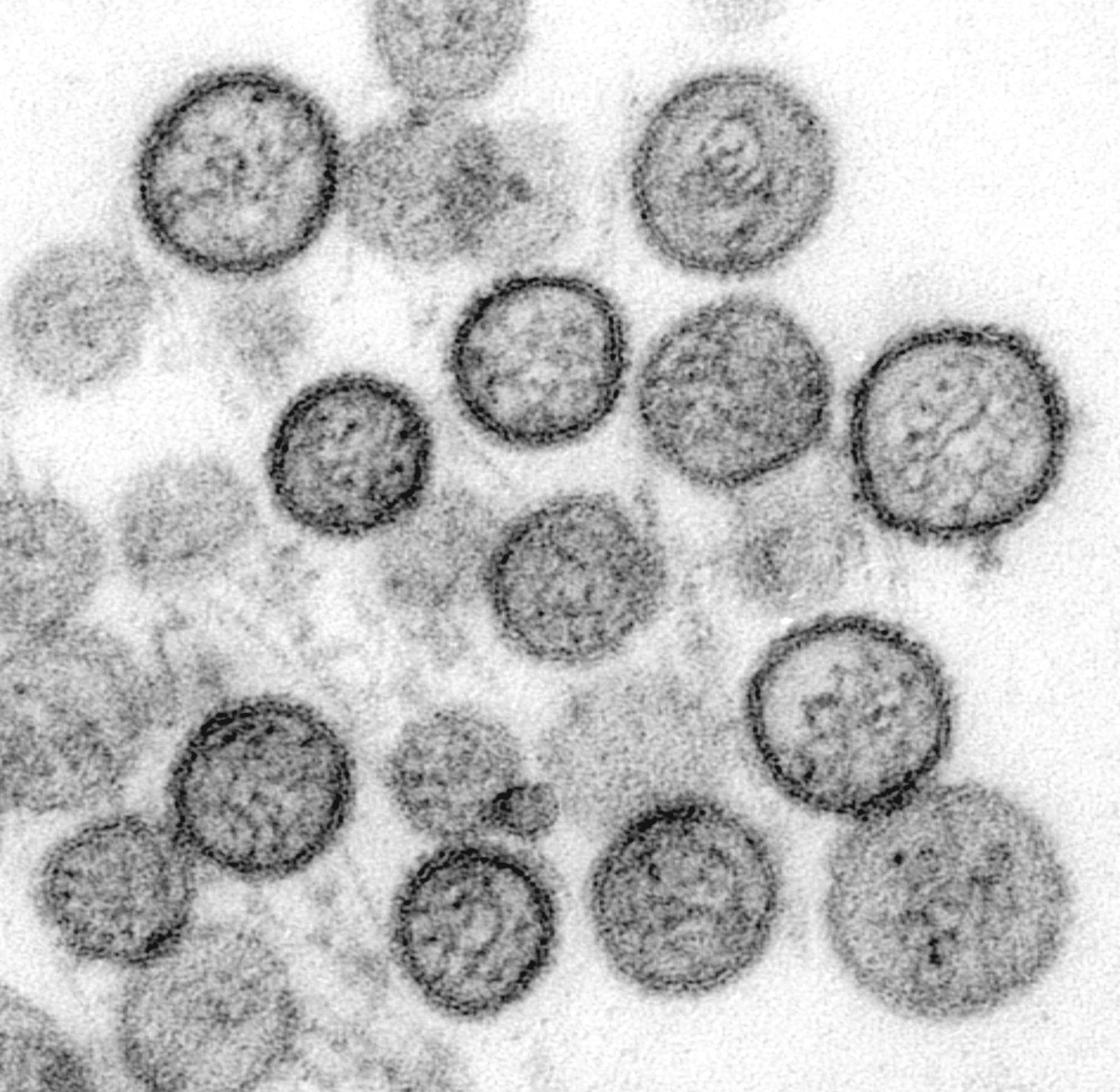
- Transmission electron micrograph of Sin Nombre virus

Virus classification
- (unranked): Virus
- Realm: Riboviria
- Kingdom: Orthornavirae
- Phylum: Negarnaviricota
- Class: Bunyaviricetes
- Order: Elliovirales
- Family: Hantaviridae
- Genus: Orthohantavirus
- Species: Orthohantavirus sinnombreense
- Virus: Sin Nombre virus

Synonyms
- Sin Nombre hantavirus; Sin Nombre orthohantavirus

= Sin Nombre virus =

Prototypical agent of hantavirus cardiopulmonary syndrome

Sin Nombre virus (SNV) is the most common cause of hantavirus pulmonary syndrome (HPS) in North America. Sin Nombre virus is transmitted mainly by the western deer mouse (Peromyscus sonoriensis). In its natural reservoir, SNV causes an asymptomatic, persistent infection and is spread through excretions, fighting, and grooming. Humans can become infected by inhaling aerosols that contain rodent saliva, urine, or feces, as well as through bites and scratches. In humans, infection leads to HPS, an illness characterized by an early phase of mild and moderate symptoms such as fever, headache, and fatigue, followed by sudden respiratory failure. The case fatality rate from infection is 30 to 50 percent.

The genome of SNV is about 12.3 kilobases (kb) in length and segmented into three negative-sense, single-stranded RNA (-ssRNA) strands. The small strand encodes the viral nucleoprotein, the medium strand encodes the viral spike protein, which attaches to cell receptors for entry into cells, and the long strand encodes the viral RNA-dependent RNA polymerase (RdRp), which replicates and transcribes the genome. Genome segments are encased in nucleoproteins to form ribonucleoprotein (RNP) complexes that are surrounded by a viral envelope that contains spikes emanating from its surface.

SNV replicates first by binding to the surface of cells with its envelope spikes. Virus particles, called virions, are then taken into the cell by endosomes, where a drop in pH causes the viral envelope to fuse with the endosome, which releases viral RNA into the host cell. RdRp then transcribes the genome for translation by host cell ribosomes and produces copies of the genome for progeny viruses. New virions are assembled near the cell membrane, where virions bud from the cell membrane and use it to obtain their viral envelope and leave the cell.

SNV was first discovered in 1993 when it caused an outbreak of disease in the Four Corners region of the US. This outbreak was historically significant since it marked the first time that pathogenic hantaviruses were discovered in the Americas as well as the discovery of HPS. Since its discovery, SNV has caused hundreds of cases of HPS in the US and Canada, where it is responsible for most HPS cases. Most cases of HPS caused by SNV occur in the western parts of the US and Canada.

== Genome ==
The genome of Sin Nombre virus is about 12.3 thousand nucleotides in length and segmented into three negative-sense, single-stranded RNA (-ssRNA) strands. The segments form into circles via non-covalent bonding of the ends of the genome. The small segment, about 2.06 kilobases (kb) in length, encodes the viral nucleoprotein and a non-structural protein that inhibits interferon production. The medium segment, about 3.7 kb in length, encodes a glycoprotein precursor that is cleaved into the two spike proteins Gn and Gc during virion assembly. The large segment, about 6.56 kb in length, encodes the viral RNA-dependent RNA polymerase (RdRp), which is responsible for transcribing and replicating the genome. The ends of each segment contain untranslated terminal regions (UTRs) that are involved in the replication and transcription of the genome.

== Structure ==
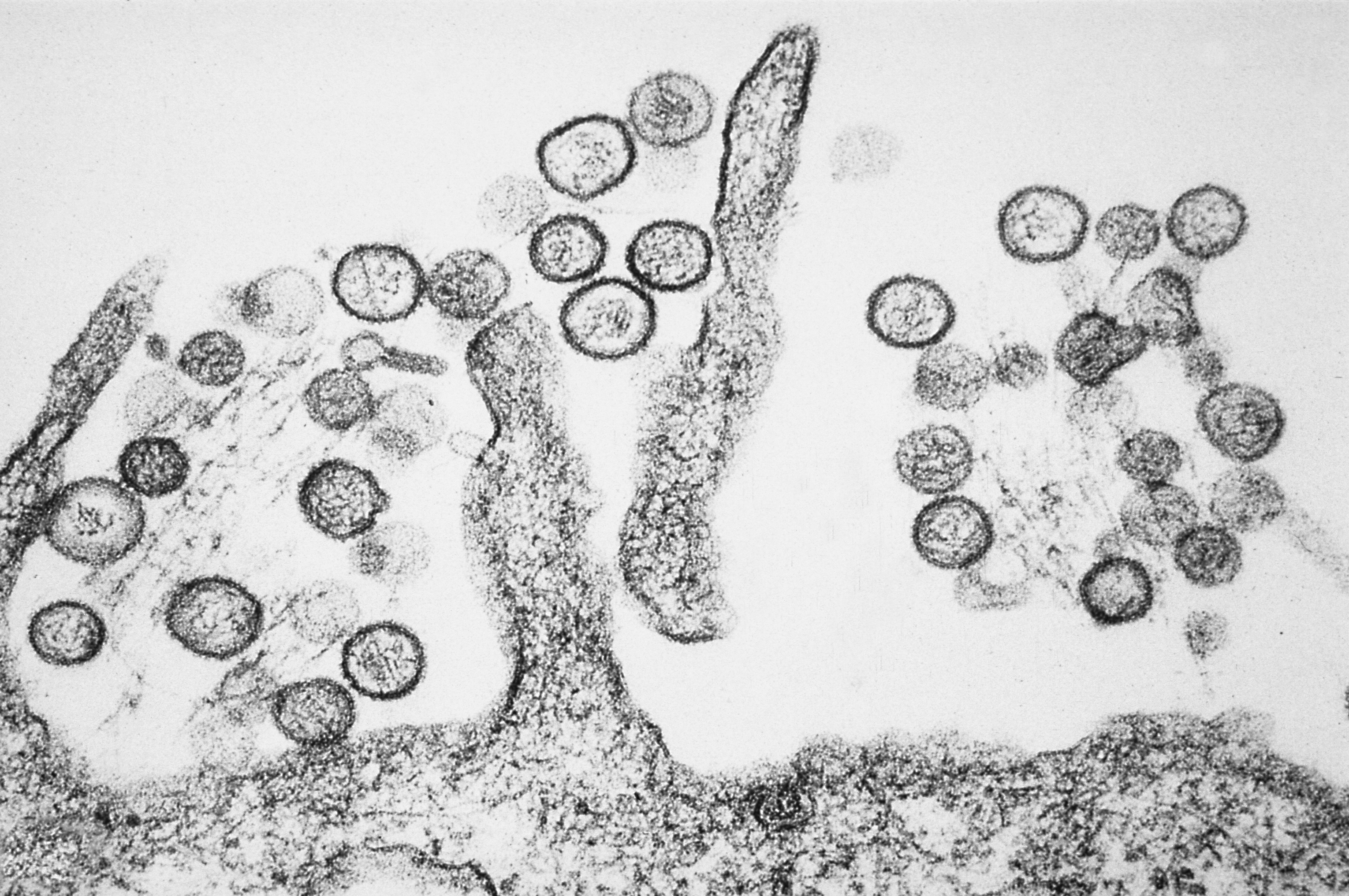
Transmission electron micrograph of Sin Nombre virus

Virions are mostly spherical or pleomorphic in shape, with an average diameter of 112 nanometers (nm). They contain a lipid envelope covered in spike proteins made of the two viral glycoproteins, Gn and Gc. The spike proteins extend about 10 nm out from the surface and are tetrameric, consisting of four copies each of Gn and Gc with helical symmetry, in which Gn forms the stalk of the spike and Gc the head. Spikes are arranged on the surface in a lattice pattern. Inside the envelope are the three genome segments, which are encased in nucleoproteins to form a ribonucleoprotein (RNP) complex. Attached to each RNP complex is a copy of RdRp. For some SNV strains, virions may be roughly tubular in shape, with an average diameter of 85 nm and an average length of 180 nm.

== Life cycle ==
SNV primarily infects endothelial cells and macrophages. It enters cells by using β3-integrins as receptors. Virions are taken into a cell via an endosome. Once pH is lowered, the viral envelope fuses with the endosome, which releases viral RNA into the host cell's cytoplasm. The small segment is transcribed by RdRp first, then the medium segment, and lastly the large segment. Once the genome has been transcribed, RdRp snatches caps from host messenger RNA (mRNA) to create viral mRNA that is primed for translation by host ribosomes to produce viral proteins.

For replication of the genome, a complementary positive-sense strand is produced by RdRp. Copies of the genome are made from this complementery strand. Progeny RNA strands are then encapsidated by nucleoproteins. During replication, the glycoprotein is cleaved in the endoplasmic reticulum by the host signal peptidase during translation. This produces Gn at the N-terminus and Gc at the C-terminus of the protein. Spike proteins are expressed on the surface of the cell membrane. Viral RNPs are transmitted to the cell membrane where they bud from the surface, thereby obtaining their envelope as the new progeny virions leave the cell.

== Evolution ==
The most common way that hantaviruses evolve is through mutations of individual nucleotides being inserted, deleted, or substituted. Because Sin Nombre virus has a segmented genome, it is possible for recombination and reassortment of segments to occur, whereby segments from different lineages mix in a single host cell and produce hybrid progeny. This has been observed for SNV in the US, mainly in exchanges of the S and M segments. Diploid progeny are also possible, in which virions may possess two of the same segment from two parent viruses.

== Ecology ==
The western deer mouse, the natural reservoir of Sin Nombre virus (Note: Many sources identify the natural reservoir of Sin Nombre virus as the species Peromyscus maniculatus. In fact, the natural reservoir of the virus is the species Peromyscus sonoriensis. The reason for this discrepancy is because the two species previously were classified as one, both under the scientific name Peromyscus maniculatus. This species was reorganized in the late 2010s and split into multiple species, including P. maniculatus and P. sonoriensis. The "old" P. maniculatus had a range extending across most of North America, whereas the "new" P. maniculatus is limited to the northeastern parts of the United States east of the Mississippi River and southeastern Canada. P. sonoriensis, on the other hand, is found in most of the United States west of the Mississippi River and in most of southwestern Canada, which corresponds to where Sin Nombre virus infections usually occur.)

Sin Nombre virus is carried chiefly by the western deer mouse (Peromyscus sonoriensis). Many other rodents, such as desert woodrats (Neotoma lepida), are considered to be dead-end hosts for SNV. The distribution of SNV closely matches that of its host's distribution. The western deer mouse is found in most of the United States west of the Mississippi River, as well as in most of southwestern Canada. P. sonoriensis mainly lives in rural areas, which mirrors where HPS cases typically occur.

In its rodent hosts, SNV causes a persistent, asymptomatic infection. The main sites of replication in deer mice are the heart, lungs, and brown adipose tissue. Rodent-to-rodent transmission occurs through contact with bodily fluids and through fighting and grooming. Transmission to humans occurs mainly through the inhalation of aerosols that contain mouse saliva, urine, or feces. Transmission can also occur through consumption of contaminated food, bites, and scratches. Antibodies to Sin Nombre virus have been detected in cats and dogs, but the role of these animals as hosts is unknown.

== Disease ==
Sin Nombre virus infection usually causes hantavirus pulmonary syndrome (HPS), also called hantavirus cardiopulmonary syndrome (HCPS). Symptoms occur within 1–8 weeks after exposure to the virus and come in three phases: prodromal, cardiopulmonary, and recovery. Prodromal, a.k.a. early, symptoms last for a few days and include fever, muscle pain, headache, coughing, nausea, vomiting, chills, and dizziness. The cardiopulmonary phase lasts for several days and is characterized by fluid buildup in the lungs, low oxygen levels in the blood, elevated or irregular heart rate, low blood pressure, cardiogenic shock, and respiratory failure. The case fatality rate from SNV infection is 30–50%.

SNV is the most common cause of HPS in the North America, and since its discovery there have been more than 700 identified cases in the US and more than 100 cases in Canada. In the US and Canada, most cases occur in the west. SNV infection is diagnosed based on observation of symptoms and testing for hantavirus nucleic acid, proteins, or hantavirus-specific antibodies. Treatment is supportive in nature and includes supplementing oxygen during the cardiopulmonary phase. No vaccines exist for Sin Nombre virus infection, so the main way to prevent infection is to avoid or minimize contact with rodents. Repeated infections of hantaviruses have not been observed, so recovering from infection likely grants life-long immunity.

== Classification ==
Sin Nombre virus is classified into the species Orthohantavirus sinnombreense. Orthohantavirus sinnombreense is classified in the genus Orthohantavirus, which is classified in the family Hantaviridae, the family that all hantaviruses belong to. Other member viruses of the species include Blue River virus, Convinct Creek 107 virus, and New York virus. The NM R11 isolate of Sin Nombre virus is the exemplar virus of the species. This taxonomy is shown as follows hereafter:

- Family: Hantaviridae
  - Genus: Orthohantavirus
    - Species: Orthohantavirus sinnombreense
      - Blue River virus, transmitted by the white-footed mouse (P. leucopus)
      - Convict Creek 107 virus, transmitted by the eastern deer mouse (P. maniculatus)
      - Monongahela virus, transmitted by the cloudland deer mouse (P. maniculatus nubiterrae), a subspecies of the eastern deer mouse
      - New York virus, transmitted by the white-footed mouse (P. leucopus)
      - Sin Nombre virus, transmitted by the western deer mouse (P. sonoriensis)
        - Four Corners virus, a name given to the virus, an isolate of SNV, that caused the 1993 Four Corners outbreak

== History ==
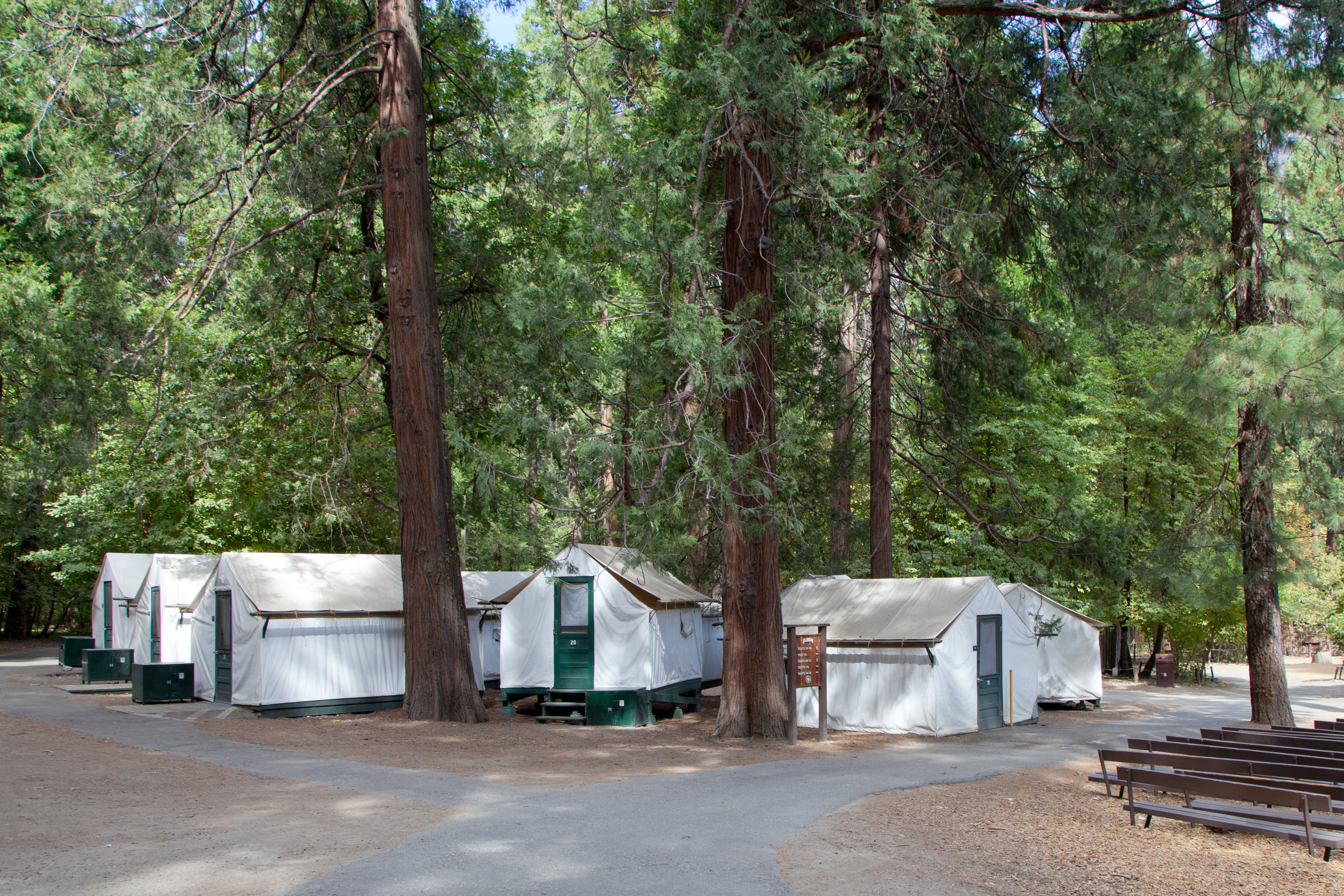
Tent cabins in Curry Village in Yosemite National Park, California. A small outbreak of HPS caused by SNV occurred in the park in 2012, mainly at Curry Village, during which ten visitors were infected and three died.

In 1993, an outbreak of highly lethal acute respiratory distress syndrome occurred in the Four Corners region of the United States. This outbreak was determined to be caused by a novel hantavirus, initially named Four Corners virus, which was later rejected because of the negative association with the region. In January 1994, the virus was given the name Muerto Canyon virus after a location near where the disease was first observed. This was opposed by locals, who did not want to be associated with the virus, so a new name was sought. Convict Creek virus was proposed, named after where the mouse used to culture the virus was captured, but this was also rejected. Ultimately, the virus was named Sin Nombre virus, Spanish for nameless virus.
