= 1993 Four Corners hantavirus outbreak =

1993 disease outbreak

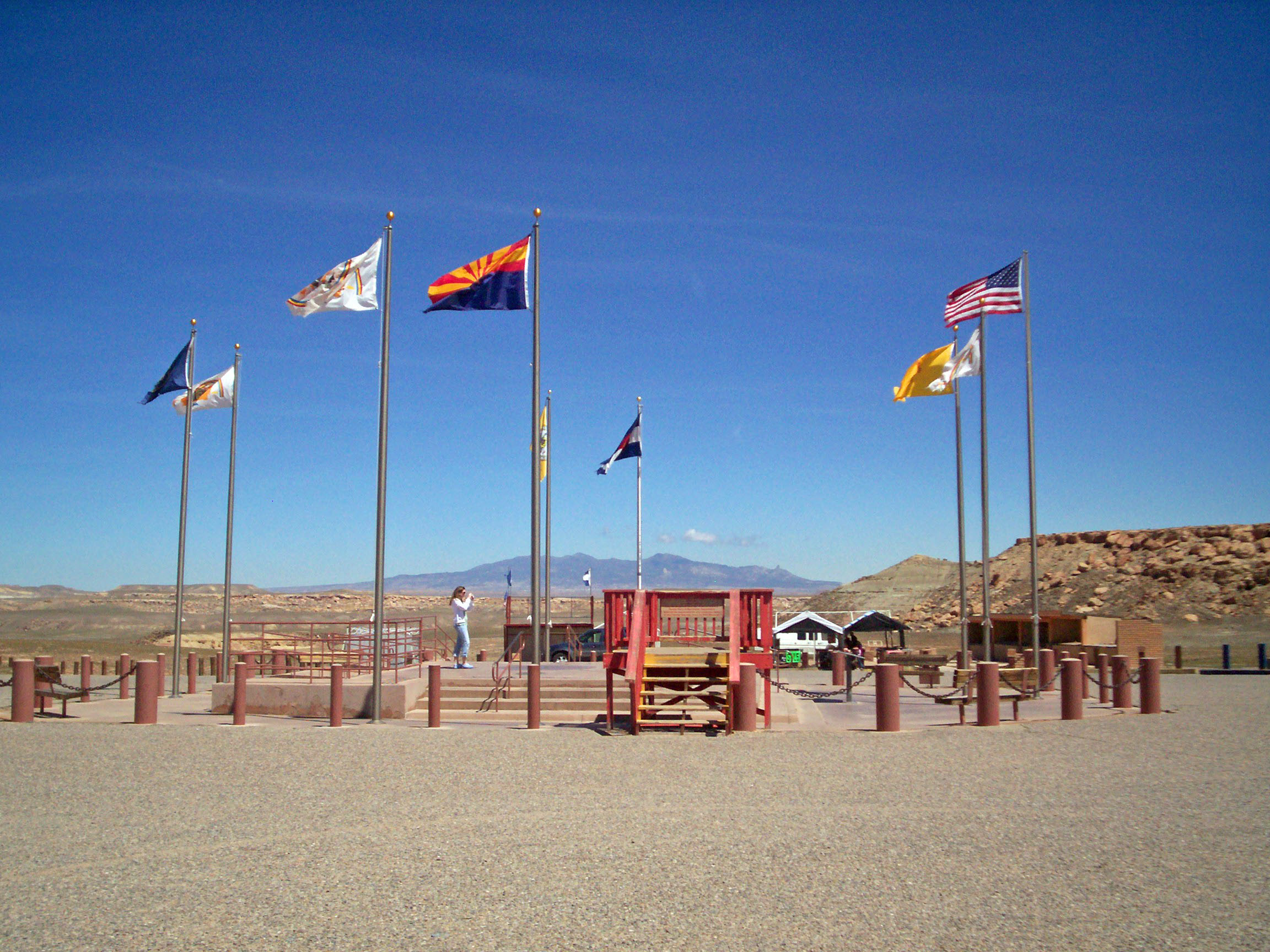
- The Four Corners Monument, at the spot where the borders of Arizona, Colorado, New Mexico, and Utah meet
- Disease: Hantavirus pulmonary syndrome
- Pathogen: Sin Nombre virus
- Source: Western deer mouse
- Location: Four Corners region, United States
- Date: 1993
- Confirmed cases: 33 in Four Corners states; 48 nationwide
- Recovered: 16 in Four Corners states; 21 nationwide
- Deaths: 17 in Four Corners states; 27 nationwide
- Fatality rate: 52% in Four Corners states; 56% nationwide

An outbreak of hantavirus disease occurred in 1993 in the United States, primarily in the Four Corners region of Arizona, Colorado, and New Mexico. Before 1993, hantaviruses that cause disease in humans, native to rodents, were known to spread mainly in Asia and Europe and to cause hemorrhagic fever with renal syndrome. The outbreak in 1993 led to the discovery of hantaviruses from the Western Hemisphere that could cause disease and revealed the existence of a second disease caused by them: hantavirus pulmonary syndrome (HPS). In the Four Corners states, 17 of the 33 HPS cases in 1993 resulted in death, a 52% case fatality rate. Nationwide that year, 27 of the 48 HPS cases resulted in death, a 56% case fatality rate.

The earliest confirmed cases of HPS in 1993 occurred in March, but the outbreak was not discovered until May when a young Navajo couple died within days of each other due to sudden respiratory failure. Investigators quickly found other people with the same symptoms as the couple. Further investigation discovered a new hantavirus, Sin Nombre virus (SNV), as the cause and identified the western deer mouse as its natural reservoir. Public health officials gave advice on how to prevent infection, and the antiviral drug ribavirin was tested on suspected cases. While the first cases to be identified were in the Four Corners region, more cases were identified outside of the area as the year went on but not in the Four Corners state Utah. Before research in 1993 showed that SNV was not spread between people, there was widespread fear that HPS was contagious. Consequently, Native Americans of the Four Corners region, especially the Navajo, experienced discrimination and racism during the outbreak.

The 1991–1992 El Niño indirectly caused the outbreak by producing a warmer-than-usual 1992–1993 winter and increased rainfall in the spring of 1993 in the Four Corners region. This increased the amount of vegetation available for rodents for food and shelter, which led to a significant increase in their numbers. The increased population density of rodents allowed SNV to spread more easily, and with a much larger population, interactions with people were more likely to occur. Further research has uncovered HPS cases before the outbreak as far back as 1959. Since the outbreak, hantaviruses that cause HPS have been identified throughout the Americas. In North America, SNV is the most common cause of the disease. HPS infections are rare, but they have a case fatality rate ranging from 12% to 45%, varying by virus. Treatment is supportive, and prevention is based on minimizing contact with rodents.

== Background ==
The Four Corners states are highlighted and include a circle to indicate the location of the Four Corners.

The Four Corners refers to the region surrounding the four-state border between southwestern Colorado, northwestern New Mexico, northeastern Arizona, and southeastern Utah. Most of the area is divided into reservations for Native American nations and tribes, namely the Navajo Nation, Hopi Reservation, Ute Mountain Ute Tribe, Southern Ute Indian Reservation, Zuni Indian Reservation, and Jicarilla Apache Nation. This sparsely populated area is part of the Colorado Plateau, a desert region with mountains, canyons, and sedimentary rock formations.

Hantaviruses are a group of viruses that constitute the taxonomic family Hantaviridae. Hantaviruses that cause disease in humans are native to rodents and assigned to the genus Orthohantavirus. Each species of hantavirus is usually transmitted by one rodent species. Before the 1993 Four Corners outbreak, Old World hantaviruses were known to cause hemorrhagic fever with renal syndrome (HFRS) and nephropathia epidemica, a milder form of HFRS, in Asia and Europe. Before this outbreak, New World hantaviruses were not known to infect or cause illness in humans.

== Course of outbreak ==
HPS frequency in the US in 1993 by month

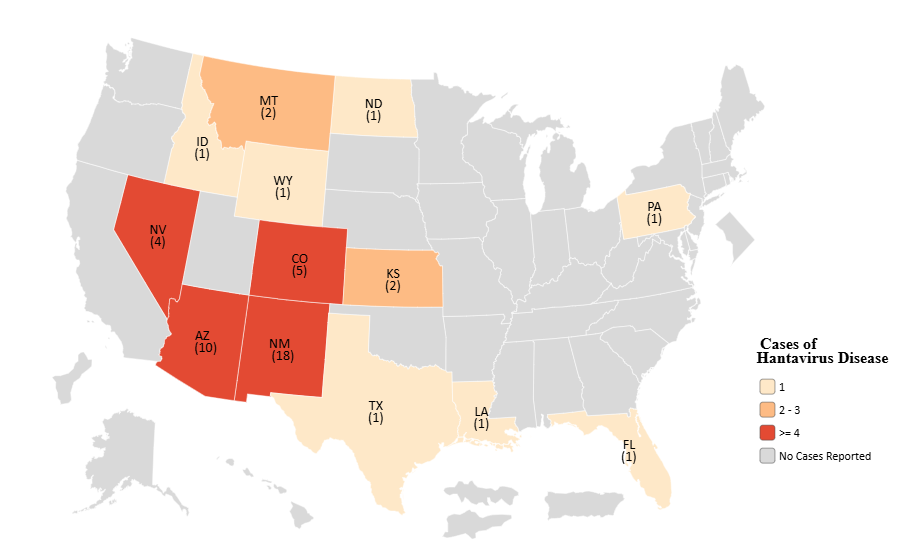
HPS frequency in the US in 1993 by state and territory

After HPS was discovered in May 1993, the outbreak was confirmed to have started earlier, in March. A dozen more cases were reported, mostly among the Navajo, in the weeks after the discovery. The outbreak continued to worsen through June and peaked in July before a sharp decline in August. HPS was first reported outside the Four Corners in Texas, in June. By mid-August, 23 hantavirus infections had been confirmed in the Four Corners region. In the Southwest, 20 of the 30 confirmed cases resulted in death, a 67% case fatality rate. As the year went on, an increasing number of cases were identified outside the Four Corners region. By October, 60 cases of hantaviral disease had been reported nationwide, about half in the Four Corners region. Thirty-nine of these cases were confirmed by laboratory testing, 25 of which led to death.

From August to December, new reports of HPS were relatively low, except for a spike in October. By the end of the year, 48 cases had been confirmed nationwide, 27 of which resulted in death. This 56% case fatality rate was similar across age, sex, and race, and it declined as physicians learned to quickly recognize HPS, identify less severe cases, and effectively treat HPS. Most of the infected were male, and, in the Four Corners region, all of the infected either lived in or visited rural areas before falling ill. Of the 33 cases to occur in 1993 in Arizona, Colorado, and New Mexico, 26 occurred during the height of the outbreak from April to July, and 17 died, a 52% case fatality rate. The only Four Corners state where no HPS was identified in 1993 was Utah.

== Outbreak investigation ==
=== Discovery ===
On May 11, 1993, a 19-year-old Navajo man, a competitive long-distance runner, visited the hospital in Crownpoint, New Mexico, for fever, muscle pain, chills, headache, and malaise. He was given an antibiotic, a drug for influenza A, and a painkiller and discharged from the hospital. He returned two days later due to persistent symptoms, vomiting, and diarrhea and was discharged with no change in treatment. On the morning of May 14, he was traveling with his family from Crownpoint to Gallup, New Mexico, when he became severely short of breath. They stopped their car in Thoreau, New Mexico, about 30 miles (42 km) east of Gallup, and contacted emergency services. By the time help arrived, he had collapsed due to respiratory failure. An ambulance crew performed CPR as he was taken to the Gallup Indian Medical Center, where he was found to have fluid buildup in his lungs (pulmonary edema). Despite efforts to resuscitate him, he died. The death of the young man due to sudden respiratory failure confused medical staff.

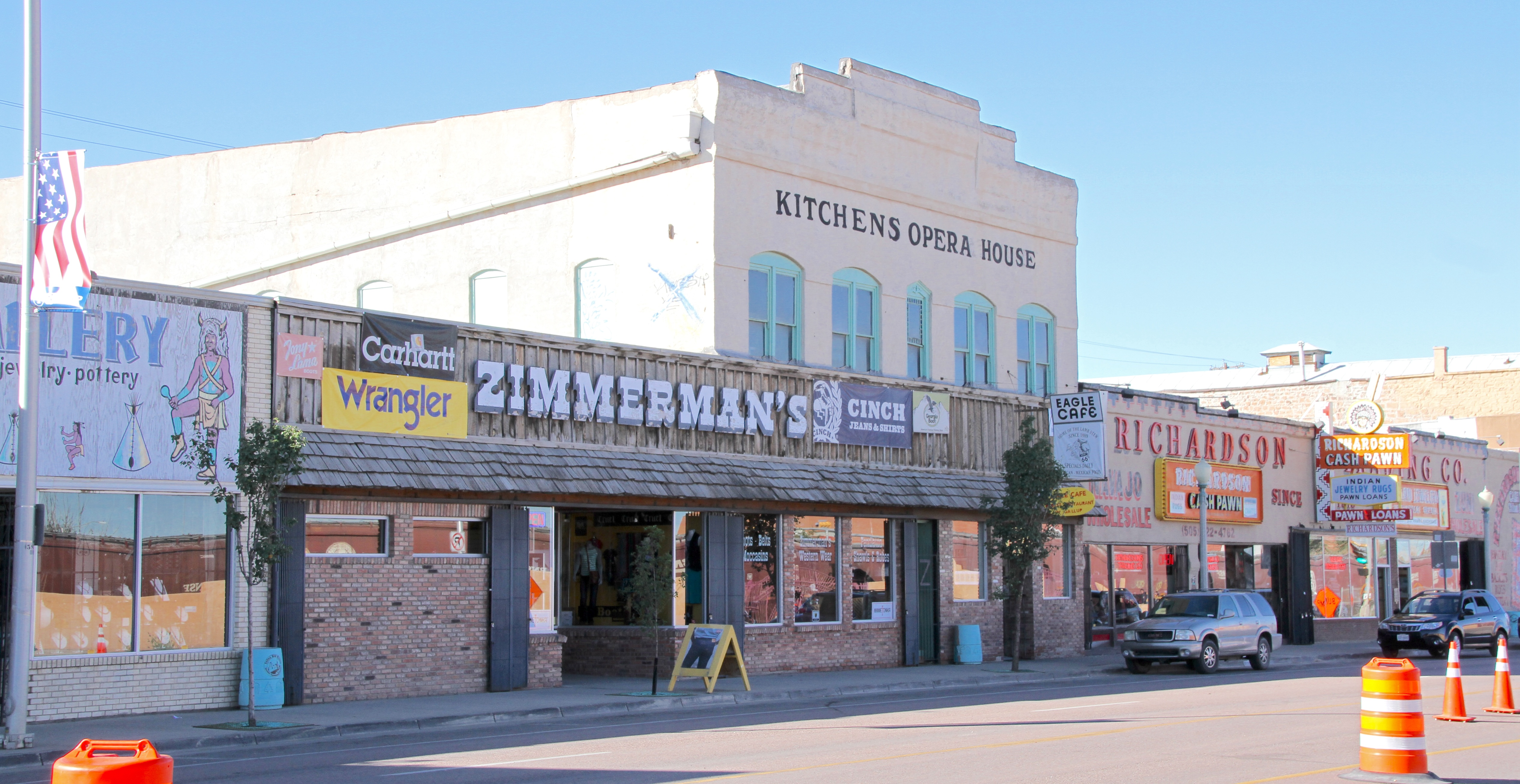
Gallup, New Mexico, where the outbreak was first noticed by investigators

Because the man's death was highly unusual, it was required by law to be reported to the New Mexico Office of the Medical Investigator (OMI) in Albuquerque, where autopsies are conducted. The deputy medical investigator in Gallup, Richard Malone, was called in to investigate his death. Malone had investigated a similar death of a 30-year-old Navajo woman a few weeks earlier, in April, at the same medical facility in Gallup. The woman's death, attributed to pulmonary edema, was examined post mortem by University of New Mexico (UNM) pathologist Patricia McFeeley, who worked with the New Mexico OMI. The woman's lungs were filled with blood plasma and more than twice as heavy as usual. Test results were negative for known infections that could have caused her death. Malone contacted McFeeley on the day of the man's death to discuss the similarities between the two cases, and she agreed to perform an autopsy on the deceased man once permission was obtained from his family.

Malone spoke to the parents of the deceased man and hoped to receive information about what could have caused his death. They told Malone that their son collapsed while they were on their way to the funeral of his fiancée. She had died five days earlier, on May 9, at the hospital in Crownpoint with the same symptoms as her fiancé. Since Crownpoint is on the Navajo reservation, the medical facility there was not required to report her death to the New Mexico OMI and did not do so. Furthermore, due to her history of asthma, her death was not considered alarming at first. After updating McFeeley on the situation, Malone convinced the families of the deceased to have the couple's bodies examined in autopsy. Later that day, McFeeley reported a possible outbreak of an unknown and deadly respiratory illness to the state health department in Santa Fe and prepared for autopsy. The autopsies of the couple showed only severe pulmonary edema with no explanation for the cause of illness.

=== Expanded scope ===
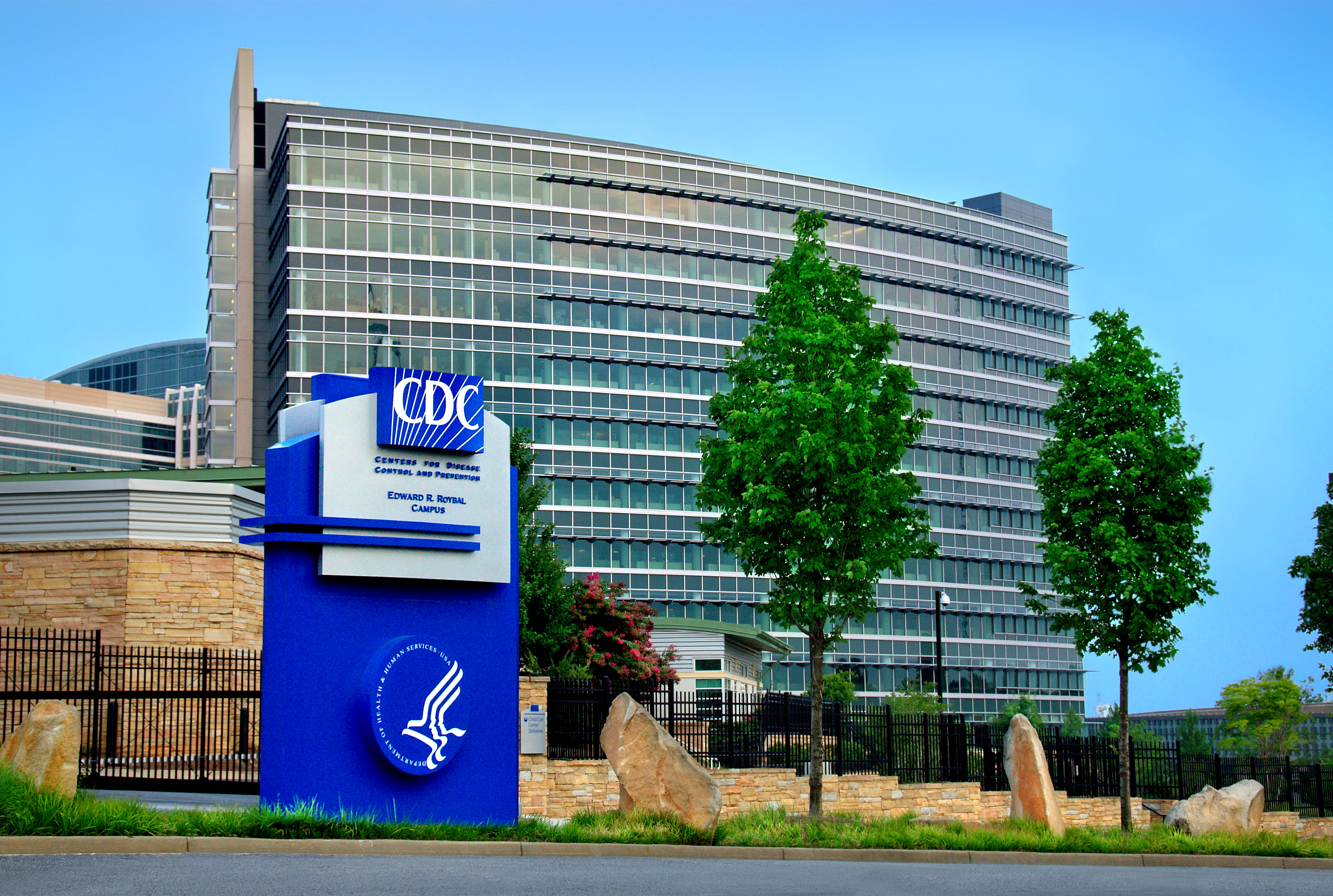
Scientists from the CDC helped identify the cause of the outbreak. Pictured is the CDC's headquarters in Atlanta, Georgia.

Malone then contacted Bruce Tempest, the medical director of Gallup Indian Medical Center. Tempest recalled having been involved in at least two discussions with physicians who had cared for young, previously healthy tribal members who suddenly died from an unknown respiratory illness. Malone and Tempest agreed that the situation required further action, so they searched for more cases. Tempest was aware of the three recent cases in New Mexico as well as one from the previous November in Arizona. Health officials in Arizona informed him of another recent case, so on May 17, Malone and Tempest notified the New Mexico Department of Health of their concerns. State officials notified the Centers for Disease Control and Prevention (CDC) on May 18 and began an investigation with the Indian Health Service (IHS) and the Navajo Nation's health department. They examined the homes of the deceased and interviewed their families and the physicians who had cared for them. On May 24, New Mexico state officials sent a letter to clinicians in the Four Corners states that described the illness and situation and asked for any similar cases to be reported to them immediately, which identified several potential cases.

After learning of the situation, the press reported on May 27 that an unknown disease was killing young tribal members in the Four Corners, which caused great anxiety in the public. Navajo and Hopi people were ostracized from the rest of society, and politicians faced pressure to respond to the situation. On the same day, New Mexico state officials contacted the CDC and asked for assistance. On May 28, a team of investigators was created and Jay Butler, an epidemiologist at the CDC's Epidemic Intelligence Service, was made the leader of the team. Less than a day later, the group arrived at Albuquerque and was transported to the University of New Mexico. There, they were joined by members of the UNM medical faculty, IHS physicians, infectious disease and toxicology experts, physicians who had treated the deceased, and various state and national health officials. Robert Breiman, a respiratory disease expert, was selected to lead the field investigation, while C. J. Peters, the head of the CDC's Special Pathogens Branch, was put in charge of the laboratory work being done at the CDC in Atlanta, Georgia.

In a meeting that took place from May 29 to May 31, the task force agreed to evaluate any person in the area from January 1, 1993, onward who had radiological imaging that showed evidence of unexplained excess substances in both lungs (bilateral infiltrates) with low levels of oxygen in the blood (hypoxemia) as well as any death accompanied with unexplained pulmonary edema. The group received clinical information about more than 30 suspected cases and considered various causes of illness. Plague, tularemia, and anthrax, among other diseases, were eliminated from consideration due to lack of evidence. The team believed the outbreak to be caused by either a new, aggressive form of influenza, an environmental toxin, or a previously unrecognized pathogen.

=== Hantavirus suspected ===
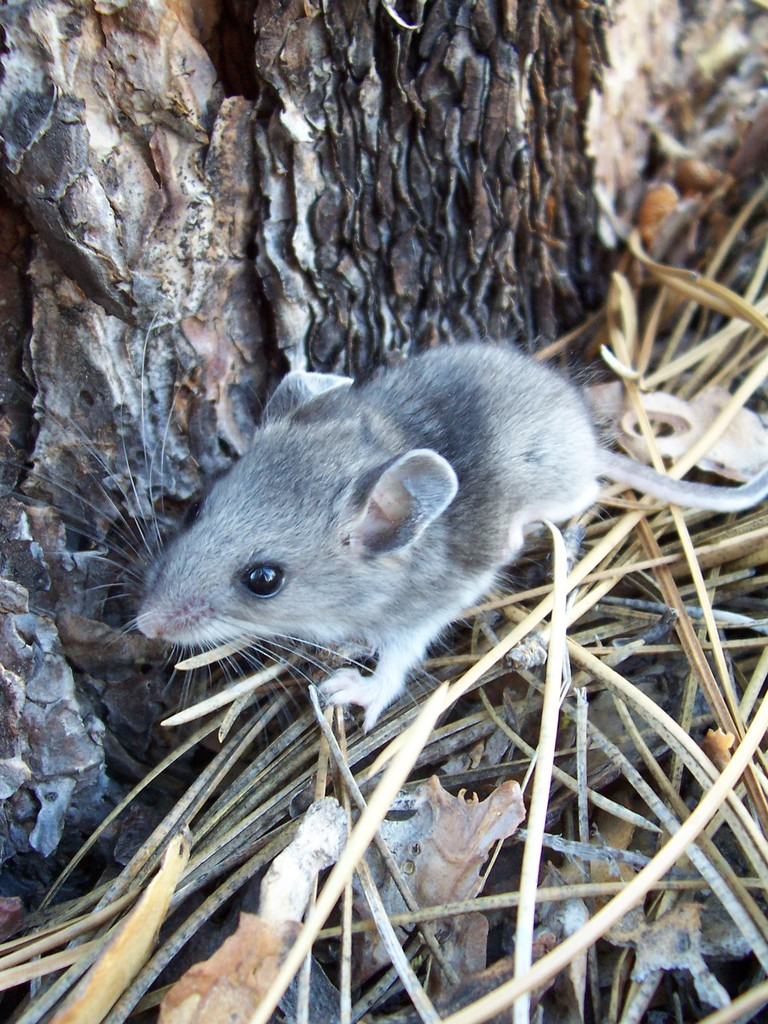
Authorities captured rodents to identify the natural reservoir of the virus causing the outbreak. The western deer mouse was the most commonly captured species and was later confirmed to host the virus. (Note: Many sources, including those from 1993, identify the natural reservoir of Sin Nombre virus as the species Peromyscus maniculatus. In fact, the natural reservoir of the virus is the species Peromyscus sonoriensis. The reason for this discrepancy is because the two species were previously classified as one, both under the scientific name Peromyscus maniculatus. This species was reorganized in the late 2010s and split into multiple species, including P. maniculatus and P. sonoriensis. The "old" P. maniculatus had a range extending across most of North America, whereas the "new" P. maniculatus is limited to southeastern Canada and the northeastern parts of the US east of the Mississippi River. P. sonoriensis, on the other hand, is found in most of the US west of the Mississippi River, including in the Four Corners region, and in most of southwestern Canada, which corresponds to where Sin Nombre virus infections usually occur.)

The investigative team started reviewing medical records on June 1 and obtained tissue samples from suspected cases. Meanwhile, epidemiologists interviewed patient and control families and inspected their homes and workplaces. After testing at a local laboratory continually yielded negative results, samples were sent to the CDC in Atlanta for immediate analysis. By June 4, scientists at the CDC's Special Pathogens Branch had tested IgM antibodies from nine people with 25 different virus samples. Antibodies from every person reacted to three hantavirus species and none of the other viruses: Hantaan virus, Puumala virus, and Seoul virus, each of which can cause HFRS. The antibody samples were then shown to be reactive to Prospect Hill virus, a hantavirus discovered in eastern meadow voles in Maryland that had never been associated with human disease or isolated from human tissue.

Several investigators had experience with and knowledge of HFRS. A distinctive feature of the disease is a significant increase in the vascular permeability of capillary endothelial cells, mainly in the kidneys, which causes massive loss of intravascular fluid into the space behind the lining of the abdominal cavity. The loss of intravascular fluid causes the density of blood cells in blood to increase, a condition called hemoconcentration. High levels of hemoconcentration were observed in several potential cases in the ongoing outbreak and, combined with the CDC's findings and the discovery of mouse feces at a home of the deceased, a hantavirus was suspected of causing the outbreak.

Before the outbreak, hantaviruses identified in the Western Hemisphere were only known to infect rodents, with no instances of human disease caused by them observed. (Note: Seoul virus, a pathogenic Old World hantavirus, was detected in the Western Hemisphere before 1993. As such, the 1993 outbreak represents the discovery of pathogenic New World hantaviruses in the Western Hemisphere.) There were also no known hemorrhagic fevers native to North America, (Note: Apart from hantaviral disease, the only other hemorrhagic fever native to North America is caused by Whitewater Arroyo virus, which was first described in 1996 and connected to human disease in 1999–2000. Dengue virus, the cause of Dengue fever, exists in southern North America, but it is not native and was introduced into the Americas in early modern times.) and none of the infected had traveled abroad or come into contact with foreigners before falling ill. Furthermore, unlike with HFRS, the disease had little kidney involvement; in all instances, the main organs affected were the lungs. Nonetheless, an unknown hantavirus that specifically infected pulmonary capillary endothelial cells was suspected by some investigators. Acting on the information gathered so far, the CDC dispatched a rodent trapping team to New Mexico, which proceeded to capture around 1,700 rodents from June 7 to mid-August at patient and control sites. The most commonly captured species was the western deer mouse.

=== New viral disease ===
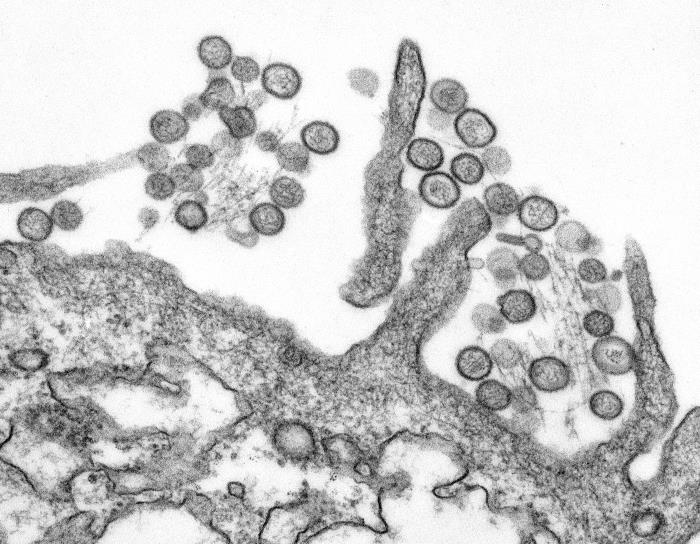
Transmission electron micrograph of Sin Nombre virus, the virus responsible for the outbreak. The spherical particles are extracellular virus bodies (virions).

At the same time as the rodent trapping operation, scientists at the CDC's Special Pathogens Branch worked to identify the virus. On June 10, reverse transcription polymerase chain reaction (RT-PCR) was used to obtain a DNA sequence 139 base pairs in length from one segment of the virus's genome from samples taken from two people who had died from the disease. Additionally, hantaviral antigens were identified in samples of tissues, such as the endothelium of the pulmonary capillary bed, by the CDC's Viral Pathology Laboratory. On June 16, the same team identified an identical viral base pair sequence and hantavirus antibodies in western deer mice captured on site, which conclusively identified the virus and its natural reservoir. By late June, testing had shown that about 30% of trapped western deer mice and smaller percentages of rodents of other species had been infected by the virus. Late that summer, researchers confirmed that the virus does not spread between people.

The virus was first cultured in November 1993 by teams at the CDC, which used tissue from a deer mouse trapped near the home of an infected person in New Mexico, and the US Army Medical Research Institute of Infectious Diseases (USAMRIID) at Fort Detrick in Frederick, Maryland, which used samples taken from a mouse trapped in California and tissue of an infected person in New Mexico. Initially, the virus was named Four Corners virus before being rejected because of the negative association with the region. The CDC and USAMRIID then, in January 1994, gave the virus the name Muerto Canyon virus after a location near where the disease was first observed, as it is customary to name hantaviruses after where they are discovered. The Navajo, however, strongly opposed any further association with the virus because of the racial discrimination that it had triggered against them. Moreover, the name was problematic given that Muerto Canyon was named after the massacre of 115 Navajo by Spanish troops in 1805, so the Navajo Nation Council unanimously voted to request the CDC to find an alternative name for the virus. The name Convict Creek virus was proposed, as the virus was cultured from a mouse captured there, but the CDC rejected this name because USAMRIID, not the CDC, had used the mouse to culture the virus. Ultimately, the CDC officially named the virus Sin Nombre virus (SNV), Spanish for virus without name.

The CDC started referring to the disease as hantavirus pulmonary syndrome (HPS) on August 5, 1993, and made it the official name in October that year. (Note: Before hantavirus pulmonary syndrome, the CDC called HPS Navajo flu during their initial response to the outbreak. Throughout 1993, the CDC also referred to it variously as hantavirus-associated respiratory disease, acute hantavirus-associated respiratory disease, hantavirus-associated respiratory illness, and acute hantavirus respiratory illness. In the press, the disease was also called hantavirus-associated ARDS.) The Hantavirus Study Group, formed to study the clinical course of the disease, published their findings in the April 7, 1994, edition of The New England Journal of Medicine. They reported 18 people who had either serologic or PCR evidence of infection, most of them young adults. Physical examination of these people showed fever, rapid and shallow breathing (tachypnea), an abnormally fast heart rate (tachycardia), and low blood pressure (hypotension). Severe pulmonary edema occurred in nearly all cases. Laboratory findings included hypoxemia, hemoconcentration, higher than normal white blood cell count in the blood (leukocytosis), abnormally low platelet levels in the blood (thrombocytopenia), and increased time needed for the liver to produce prothrombin and for blood to clot. According to the CDC, early signs of illness included fever, muscle pain, headache, variable respiratory symptoms such as coughing, and gastrointestinal symptoms such as abdominal pain, nausea, and vomiting. The early stage of the disease was then followed by sudden respiratory distress. Bilateral pulmonary infiltrates developed within two days of hospitalization, and fever, low oxygen levels (hypoxia), and hypotension were present during hospitalization. People who recovered from HPS during the outbreak did not experience any long-term complications. Death was the result of pulmonary edema or heart failure.

== Government response ==
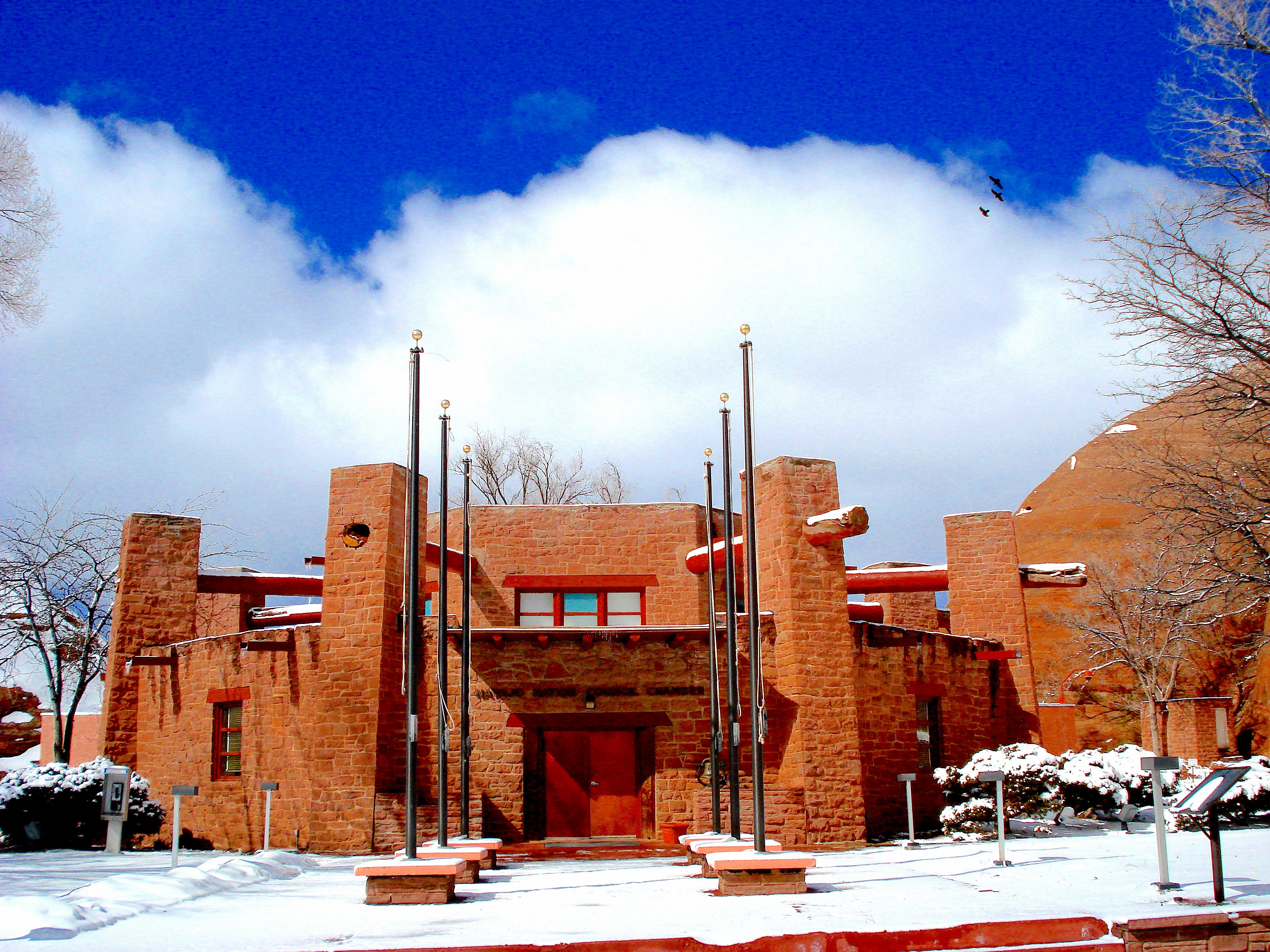
Window Rock, Arizona, where Navajo medicine men met to discuss the outbreak, is the capital of the Navajo Nation. Pictured is the Navajo Nation Council Chamber building in Window Rock.

Fifty Navajo medicine men met in Window Rock, Arizona, (Note: Sources differ on when the meeting of 50 Navajo medicine men took place. Stumpff says this meeting occurred "by May," Donovan on May 25, and Sternberg on June 1.) to discuss the outbreak and told people to be wary of deer mice and prairie dogs. Navajo elders were aware of the danger of mouse feces and urine, so they recommended burning contaminated clothing and keeping food away from mice. At the same time, Navajo medicine men performed blessings and purification ceremonies at locations involved in the outbreak, such as places where people fell ill. The Navajo Nation's government responded to the outbreak by declaring a public health emergency and establishing an Incident Management Team and Inter-Agency Working Group. They also implemented rodent control and public health education programs, providing rat traps to residents and informing them about HPS and ways to reduce their risk of exposure to infected mice.

The government opened a toll-free telephone hotline on June 3 to provide updated information about unexplained respiratory illness and to receive calls about suspected HPS throughout the country. Public health officials advised people to prevent rodents from entering their homes, avoid leaving out food that could attract them, and trap and dispose of rodents while wearing rubber gloves and surgical masks. To deal with rodent excretions, health officials recommended soaking them in a chlorine bleach solution and then wrapping them in double plastic bags before disposing of them. People were warned to avoid inhaling dust in places infested with mice because the dust could have aerosols that contain the virus. Health officials did not recommend poisoning mice since they could die somewhere inaccessible and still spread the virus.

Medical care provided during the outbreak included preventing secondary infections and supporting the body's functions during recovery. Many of the infected were placed on ventilators, often while sedated. Most rural physicians attempted to stabilize people suspected to have HPS and transport them to other facilities such as the UNM medical center in Albuquerque. Large regional hospitals, particularly the one at UNM, had higher survival rates due to easier access to equipment and expertise. On June 4, the antiviral drug ribavirin was made available for treatment, and intravenous ribavirin stocks were provided to healthcare facilities in the Four Corners region. Intravenous administration of ribavirin had effectively treated severe Hantaan virus infections when provided early during illness, so it was tested experimentally on suspected cases during the outbreak. The CDC considered removing the possibility of infection by trapping and poisoning deer mice, but this was rejected as infeasible given the large geographic area and undesirable since mice are an important part of the ecosystem.

== Social and economic impact ==
During the outbreak, national media were not respectful of the traditional four-day mourning period in Navajo culture. The local community was inundated with media who took pictures of funerals, published the names of the deceased, and attempted to interview families of the deceased. Sometimes, the media incorrectly reported the names of the deceased and communities. According to Stumpff, media coverage often caused people to view Navajo culture negatively and associate the disease with the Four Corners, and the disease was publicly referred to as various names related to the area, including Navajo Flu, Navajo Illness, and Four Corners Illness. In many instances, residents posted anti-media signs along roads. Some people felt so much resentment that they refused to assist investigators, who also failed to respect mourning practices as they continuously asked for information about recent deaths. Within a month of the outbreak's discovery, it was apparent that HPS was not restricted to the Navajo or the Four Corners region. By that point, however, the Navajo were left to deal with the stigma created by the media, which moved on to other news. (Note: According to Duane Beyal, the executive press officer of the Navajo Nation, local media tended to report on the outbreak better than national outlets. He did, however, praise national media such as Reuters for responding well to criticism.)

Before the disease's transmission method was confirmed, there was widespread fear that it was contagious. This contributed to discrimination and racism against the Navajo. For example, some restaurants refused to serve Navajo people, while in others staff wore gloves when serving them or threw away their used plates instead of re-using them. People's fears were intensified by the high case fatality rate of HPS even though there was no evidence for transmission between people. Because of these fears, local restaurants saw a significant decline in business, many people stopped going to the movies, and hardly any people attended the annual Gallup Inter-Tribal Indian Ceremonial that was held that year. Some people wore surgical masks when leaving the house. In general, though, people in the area only went outside when necessary. In response to news reports, numerous people canceled vacations to the area, and revenue from tourism declined.

Peterson Zah, the president of the Navajo Nation, was a vocal critic of the news coverage of the outbreak and the stigmatization of the Navajo. He said: "The story of hantavirus is a perfect example of an intercultural setting and the friction that lies just beneath the surface, and which explodes when unknowing outsiders trample on age-old customs. Deaths and the unknown nature of the illness served only to reinforce stereotypes ... [and] the view of Indians as second-class citizens was further supported." During the outbreak, Zah appealed to the media to respect the privacy of people who lost family members and urged tribal members to assist medical investigators. Before the cause of the outbreak was identified, many Navajo speculated that the disease was brought to the reservation by tourists or that Fort Wingate, located 20 miles (32 km) south of the reservation, had stored a biological or chemical weapon that escaped, because the US Army was closing its depot there at the time of the outbreak. Later on, some Navajo expressed skepticism toward the connection to mice. One chapter president instead blamed toxic wastes or radioactivity for causing the outbreak. (Note: In the Navajo Nation, Chapters are the local form of government, and the Chapter President is an elected official.)

== Historical analysis ==
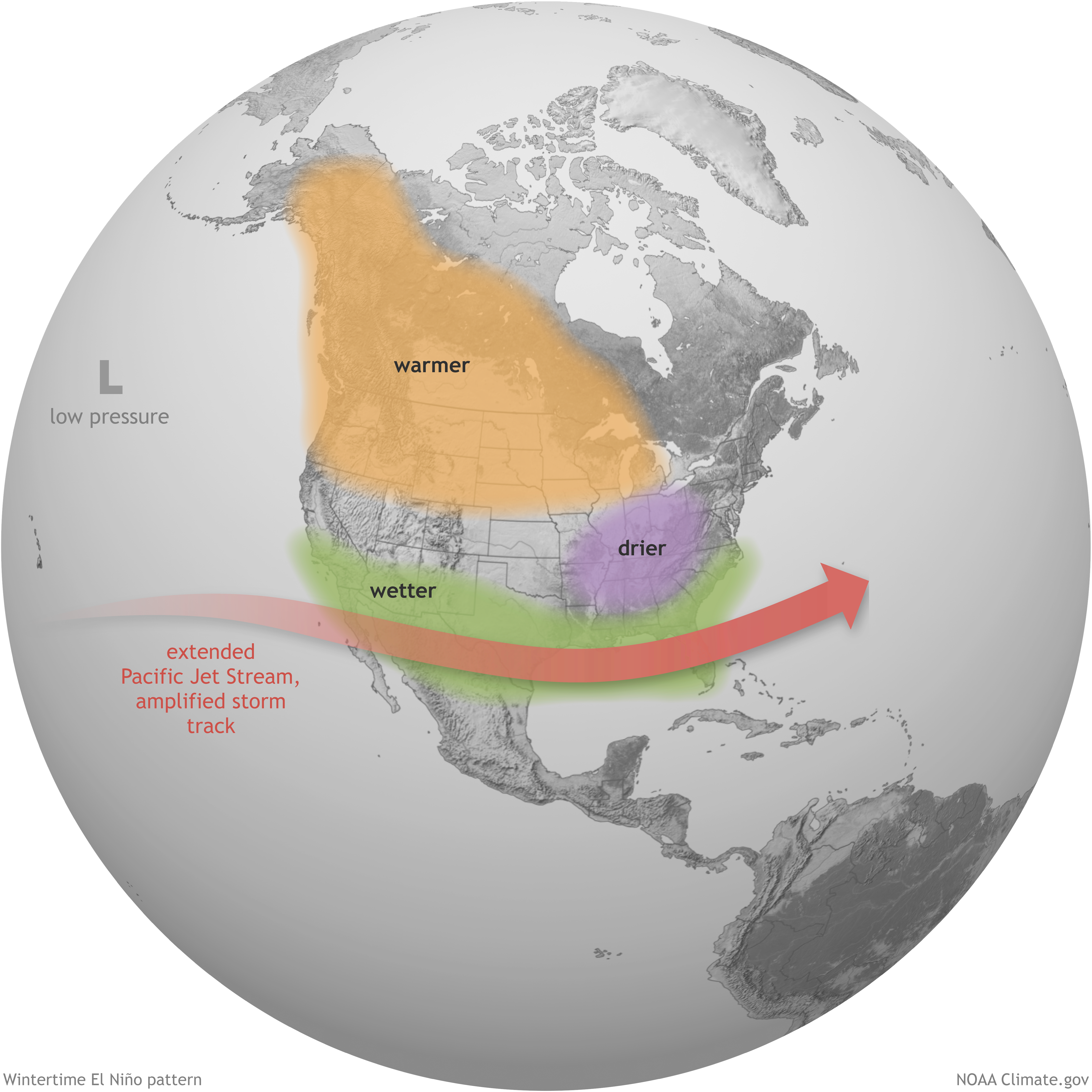
El Niño increases wetness in the southern United States during winter.

A group of UNM biologists studying deer mice near the Four Corners region at the time noticed that their population significantly grew from May 1992 to May 1993. Working with environmental scientists, they demonstrated that the conditions of the 1991–1992 El Niño caused a relatively warm 1992–1993 winter and a rainy 1993 spring in the Four Corners region. The area had been experiencing drought for a few years, but with more snowmelt and rainfall came a relative abundance of springtime vegetation in the region. This provided more shelter and food for local animals, which led to rapid growth of the rodent population and, in turn, increased the number of interactions between humans and rodents. Furthermore, with a higher population density of mice, SNV was able to spread more easily among them.

According to traditional Navajo beliefs, mice inhabit the nocturnal and outdoor world and humans the daytime and indoor world. The two should not mix or sickness and death may occur. When mice enter a house and find a disorderly environment with food lying about, they become angry at the mess and may strike down a family member, usually someone young and healthy. Navajo oral tradition spoke of past outbreaks in 1918, 1933, and 1934, which they attributed to excess caused by disharmony. Every year in which an outbreak occurred had excess rain and snowfall, which led to increased rodent food supply and consequently greater rodent populations and more human-rodent interactions.

Genetic analysis of SNV has indicated that it has existed in its natural reservoir since long before the outbreak. Biologists believe that people probably died from hantavirus infection before the outbreak but that their cause of death was unknown. Tempest, when recollecting on people he had treated in the years before the outbreak, said: "I will never be able to know for sure but I believe they were also Hantavirus victims." Serum samples collected in 1991 and 1992 as part of the Navajo Health and Nutrition Survey were tested in June 1993 and showed that three people out of 270 had antibodies to hantaviruses, indicative of past infection. By examining tissue samples from people who died from unexplained acute respiratory distress syndrome (ARDS), a 38-year-old man who died in Utah in 1959 became the earliest confirmed instance of HPS.

== HPS since the outbreak ==
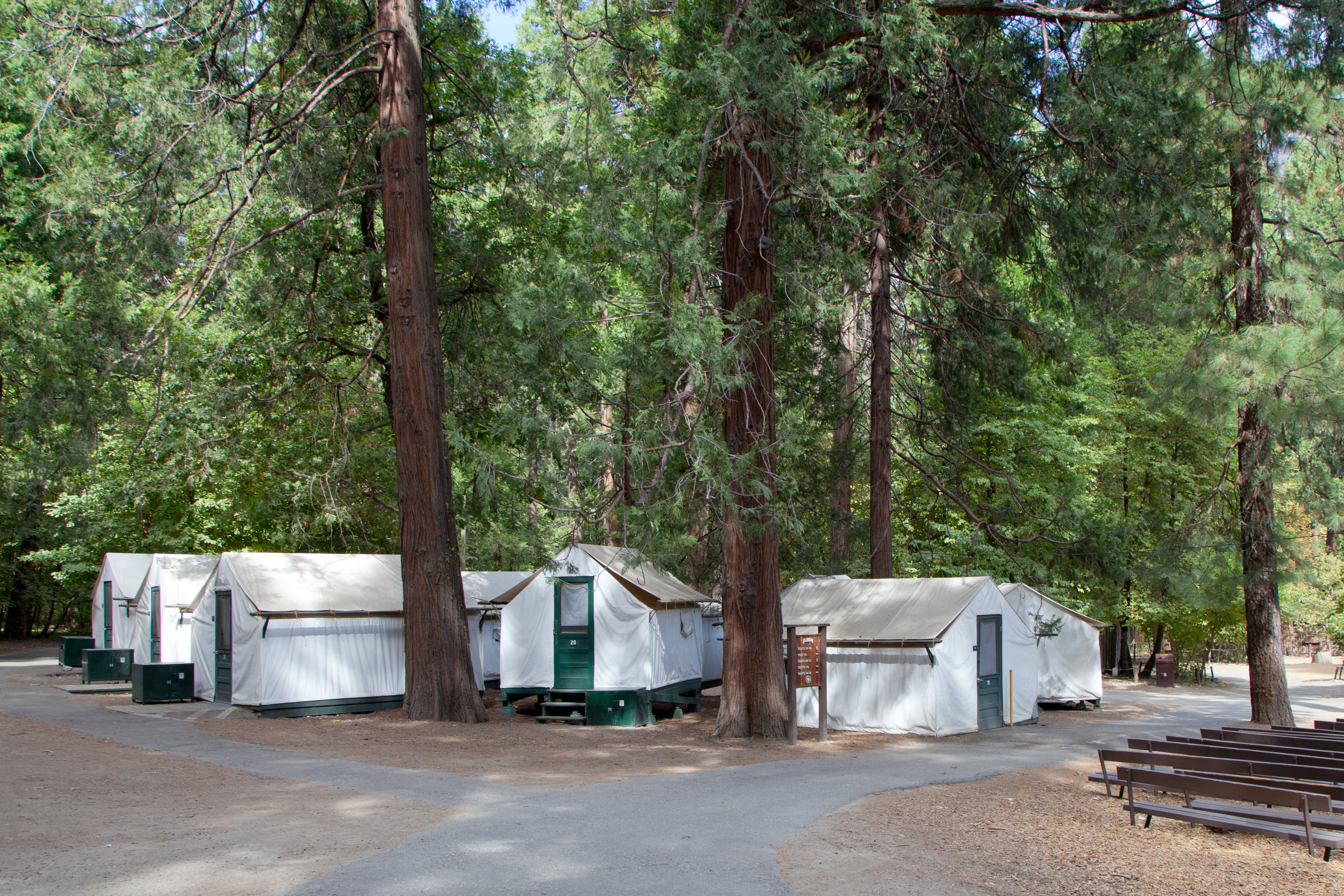
Tent cabins in Curry Village in Yosemite National Park, California. A small outbreak of HPS occurred in the park in 2012, mainly at Curry Village, during which ten visitors were infected and three died.

Following the outbreak, the medical community in the US was asked to report HPS-like illnesses with unexplained causes. Other hantaviruses responsible for HPS were subsequently found, including Bayou virus, Black Creek Canal virus, and New York virus. The disease has since been found to also occur in Canada, Panama, and most of South America. In the Navajo Nation, the government has implemented long-term prevention and control strategies to address HPS, including rodent control and surveillance programs and public health education, and the CDC Foundation has worked with the Navajo community to implement rodent control measures and educate people about HPS.

SNV is the most common cause of HPS in North America. It is primarily associated with one rodent species, and other hantaviruses discovered in North America follow the same pattern. Infections are usually contracted by inhaling aerosols of rodent feces, urine, or saliva. A few dozen cases occur each year, most from April to August in rural areas in western states and provinces. In South America, Andes virus is the most common cause of HPS and is transmitted primarily by the long-tailed pygmy rice rat. More than 200 cases occur every year, mostly in Argentina, Brazil, and Chile.

Although HPS was feared by many to be contagious during the 1993 outbreak, transmission of SNV between people has never been confirmed, and there is little evidence of human-to-human transmission of hantaviruses in general. Because of the health risks imposed by hantaviruses, however, rodents and other small mammals are routinely surveilled to monitor hantavirus circulation. Environmental factors influence the rodent population, which can make HPS more or less frequent. For example, harsher wet winters are associated with a smaller deer mouse population, while rainfall is beneficial to their population by increasing food availability. Consequently, lower winter temperatures are associated with lower HPS incidence, and greater rainfall is associated with higher HPS incidence.

Treatment of HPS is supportive and includes cardiac monitoring, mechanical ventilation, and extracorporeal membrane oxygenation. Despite these measures, the disease still has a high case fatality rate, ranging from about 12% to 45%, varying by virus. Experimental testing of ribavirin during the outbreak did not show a significant benefit to its use, and research has since shown that it is ineffective if administered after the early stage of HPS. As a result, the CDC does not recommend ribavirin as a treatment for the disease. Additionally, there are no approved vaccines to protect against New World hantavirus infections. To prevent infection, the CDC advises people to avoid contact with rodents, prevent them from entering one's home, keep one's home clear of food that may attract them, and safely clean up after them.

== See also ==
- MV Hondius hantavirus outbreak
