= South African law of agency =

Legal relationships between principals and third parties

The law of agency in South Africa regulates the performance of a juristic act on behalf or in the name of one person ("the principal") by another ("the agent"), who is authorised by the principal to act, with the result that a legal tie (vinculum juris) arises between the principal and a third party, which creates, alters or discharges legal relations between the principal and a third party. Kerr states that, in legal contexts, the word "agent" is most commonly used of a person whose activities are concerned with the formation, variation or termination of contractual obligations, and that agency has a corresponding meaning. It is the agent's position as the principal's authorised representative in affecting the principal's legal relations with third parties that is the essence of agency.

The term "agency" is sometimes used more broadly, to describe both the position of an agent as representative of a principal to perform juristic acts that affect the principal's legal relations with third parties, and also a relationship of mandate in which an "agent" is bound as mandatary to carry out some task for the principal as mandator. In general, the aim of the appointment of an agent is the performance of a service for the principal, but many besides agents perform services for another. One must therefore consider other characteristics when identifying the nature of agency. It is the substance of the relationship that is important: The essence of agency is that the agent is the principal's authorised representative in effecting the principal's legal relationships with third parties.

== Agency, representation and mandate ==
It is important to distinguish between the elements of representation and mandate.

=== Representation ===
Hosten refers to agency and representation interchangeably. The latter, however, refers to instances of purely juristic representation: Representation entails one person's performing a juristic act on behalf of another. The agent's ability, as representative, to affect the principal's legal relations is primarily derived from, and its extent determined by, the agent's authority to do so. "An act of representation," held Corbett JAA in Joel Melamed and Hurwitz v Cleveland Estates (Pty) Ltd; Joel Melamed and Hurwitz v Vorner Investments (Pty) Ltd, "needs to be authorized by the principal. Such authorization is usually contained in a contract." The authorisation of the representative is a distinct unilateral act. It is sometimes closely associated with an agreement between the parties, but may also arise by operation of law. Although some representatives (such as public officials, company directors, guardians and curators) are often referred to loosely as agents, the current tendency is to reserve the term "agent" to denote a representative who is bound by contract with a principal to carry out a mandate and also authorised to create, alter or discharge legal relations for the principal.

This modern notion of an agent as representative—that is, as someone who enters into contracts for a principal on which the agent usually cannot be held personally liable—was not generally recognised in Roman law. The idea eventually came to form part of Roman-Dutch law, although it was not developed to the same extent as the modern principles of commercial agency in England and America. As a result, South African courts have been greatly influenced by Anglo-American law in developing the South African law of agency.

=== Mandate ===
Mandate (mandatum, Afr lasgewing) is a contract in which one person, the mandatary, undertakes to perform some lawful task for another, the mandator. In Roman-Dutch law, the contract was said to be essentially gratuitous. If the parties agreed on a payment for the services rendered, the contract was one of letting and hiring of work or services: locatio conductio operis or operarum respectively. It was accepted in practice, however, that the mandator might offer a reward or honorarium, not in payment but in gratitude, for the mandatary's services. There is no objection in modern law to the remuneration of the mandatary, with the result that it is difficult to distinguish the contract of mandate from that of letting and hiring of work or services.

In Roman law, the mandatary was not the mandator's representative. Where the mandator concluded contracts with third parties in executing the mandate, the mandatary did so in his own name and not on the mandator's behalf. The rights and duties under such contract were the mandatary's alone. While the mandator could indirectly acquire rights against the third party by means of cession, he she could not do so directly. The position in modern law is different. The mandate may well include a power to represent the mandator, but it need not do so. For example, a person wishing to sell a house will often instruct an estate agent merely to find a suitable purchaser with whom the seller might conclude the sale personally, but may also authorise the estate agent to sell the property on the seller's behalf.

Where the mandate involves, or is coupled with, a power (or authority) to represent the mandator, the mandatary is an agent. The term "agent" is difficult to define, however, for it has a variety of meanings. Sometimes it is used to denote the representation where the emphasis falls on the juristic relationship established by the agent between the principal and third party. At other times, it is used to refer to the contractual relationship between the principal and agent: the so-called "contract of agency" that in reality is a species of mandate. Very often, the term is used in a broad sense to embrace both the contract between the principal and agent, and the concept of representation. This usage, while criticised, is almost inescapable because both mandate and representation are obviously fundamental elements of the field of law generally referred to as the law of agency.

In modern commercial law, the agent is simply and solely the representative of the principal, on whose behalf the agent transacts with third parties. Such transactions are the principal's transactions. They inure to the principal's benefit or render the principal liable, as the case may be, without any benefit or liability attaching to the agent. The agent acts merely as a conduit to bring about a legal relationship between the principal and the third party.

== Agency and other contracts ==
In SA law of contract: "independent contractor" normally used to mean conductor operis—one who's obliged to produce certain finished work. "Typical examples," as cited by Kerr, "are a builder who is obliged to complete a house or a building, a manufacturer who is obliged to build a ship, a weaver who is obliged to make cloth from wool supplied to him, and a person who is obliged to wash or mend clothes."

Independent contract operates in similar way to that of the mandatory. Conductores operis share with mandataries & employees an obligation to do the work they contract to do. The contracts of all three of these classes differ fundamentally from those of independent agents. IAs not obliged to do any work at all if they don't want to. IA not subject to any control/supervision of the locator; he is his own master. This is why, according to Kerr, description of IA as a locator operis, as in Colonial Mutual Life Assurance Society Ltd v Macdonald, "is likely to cause confusion."

It is not clear from report in Smit v Workmen's Compensation Commissioner whether or not the appellant insurance agent was an IA or one who was obliged to make use of opportunities to be of service to his principal. If he were an independent agent, he could not have been a conductor operis. Since the court held that that is what he was, "it should be assumed that he was obliged to further his principal's interests." What Kerr finds "puzzling" about the decision is that the court did not discuss whether or not he was a mandatary. If he had an obligation to further his principal's interests, the category of mandatary would have been "the more appropriate."

The insurance agent in Colonial Mutual Life Assurance Society Ltd v Macdonald was an independent agent. In two of the three opinions in the case, however, he was described as an "independent contractor," because the case was on delict, and that is the term used in some delict cases—especially in English cases or cases influenced by them. In English and American law, the division between "independent contractors," on the one hand, and those who are variously described as "agents" or "employees" (or "servants"), on the other hand, is based on the needs of the law of delict in respect of vicarious liability. Writers on English law are aware of the handicaps inherent in such a proceeding, "which is," for Kerr, "an added reason for not adopting it in our law."

In South African law, the distinction between employees (or servants) and independent contractors is based on the distinction between locatio conductio operarum and locatio conductio operis faciendi. These categories, being contractual, "should be defined with the law of contract in mind." In the case of employment, the employer is vicariously liable for the delictual acts of the employee committed during course of his employment. In the case of an independent contractor, the principal or locator is not delictually liable. The case of Chartaprops (Pty) Ltd & another v Silberman, highly important, illustrates this principle. Mrs Silberman was injured in casu when she slipped and fell in a shopping mall owned by Chartaprops, which had appointed a company, Advanced Planning, to do the cleaning of the mall. A slippery substance was left undetected by the employees of Advanced Planning; Silberman sustained an injury as a result, and sued both companies—Advanced Planning on the basis of the negligence of its employees in failing to detect and remove the substance, which had been lying on floor for about thirty minutes. There was evidence also that Chartaprops was in habit of checking on and inspecting Advanced Planning's activities. But Chartaprops, too, had failed to detect the substance. In court a quo, both respondents were found to be liable, jointly and severally. They appealed, and leave to do so was granted.

Nugent JA disagreed with the court a quo, which he said had erred in holding Chartaprops liable vicariously for the negligence of Advanced Planning. Liability, according to Nugent, could be found elsewhere, but it could not be on the basis of vicarious liability: "Where liability arises vicariously, it is because the defendant and the wrongdoer stand in a particular relationship to one another." According to Nugent, the rules which applied in this case did not involve the role of independent contractor; the employer is not and ought not to be held responsible for the actions of an independent contractor. The defendant might be responsible for its own omission, its own failure to act, or to perform its own legal duties, taking reasonable steps as articulated in Kruger v Coetzee. Nugent applied the principle of non-delegability, based on English law: There was a duty on Chartaprops, as owner of the mall, to ensure that its visitors were reasonably safe. It could not shift this responsibility to the cleaning company. According to Nugent, therefore, liability rested on Chartaprops as the owner of the premises: "A person who invites the public to frequent a shopping mall will be expected by members of the public to have ensured that the floors of the premises are reasonably safe and they will expect to look to that person if they are not." Chartaprops had failed, in Nugent's view, in its duty to the public to ensure that its premises were safe. Nugent exonerated Advanced Planning on the grounds that it owed no such duty to the public; any omission on its part was therefore not actionable. This judgment, although progressive, is clearly wrong, according to Richman Mqeke, since it is based on non-delegability.

The majority judgment, written by Ponnan JA, disagreed with Nugent's for the same reason. The principal, on his view, is not liable for wrongs committed by an independent contractor or its employees. Ponnan relied on a number of cases, most important of these being Langley Fox Building Partnership v De Valence 1991 (1) SA 1 (A), in which the Appellate Division held that the principal is not liable for the civil wrongs of an independent contractor, and that the principal would only be liable if personally at fault. Ponnan also referred to classic test in Kruger, but he applied it differently:

(a) (W)ould a reasonable man have foreseen the risk of danger in consequence of the work he employed the contractor to perform? If so,

(b) would a reasonable man have taken steps to guard against the danger? If so,

(c) were such steps duly taken in the case in question?

According to Ponnan, there was no justification for making an exception in the case under consideration, in order to allow a person who is injured to recover from a principal in addition to the normal rights which an injured person should enjoy against the independent contractor. Ponnan also pointed out that there was no justification, in the fiction of the principle of non-delegability, for shifting the economic cost of the negligent acts of Advanced Planning, which was primarily responsible for the damage, to Chartaprops. The principle of non-delegability, according to Ponnan, had caused a great deal of misunderstanding. Ponnan held that the position in Roman-Dutch law, as articulated in some of cases he named, should not be changed. He thus restated the long-standing authority of the Roman-Dutch position. If the view of Nugent had been the majority view, it would have changed current South African law.

The most important proposition concerning contracts of employment, therefore, "is not that there is vicarious liability in delict: it is that the employee is obliged to do whatever work falls within the compass of the agreement, and that the employer is obliged to pay whatever remuneration has been agreed upon. If the rules of the law of delict require that attention be paid to differing categories of persons it is for those rules to lay down what categories are necessary in delict." The choice in delict seems to Kerr to be between

1. delimiting categories according to the requirements of that branch of the law, and giving the categories so delimited new titles of their own; and
2. making use of established categories in the law of contract.

If the categories of the law of contract are adopted, "the limits of those categories [...] should be adopted." The more strictly the principle of retaining contractual descriptions of contractual categories is adhered to, "the more valuable will cases in either branch of the law be when a decision in the other branch of the law is under consideration and the person in question falls into a category which is relevant in both branches."

It is not only in case law that one has difficulty with the term "independent contractor." An example of a difficulty in statute law is to be found in the law relating to estate agents. The term "independent contractor" does not normally mean an employee, but rule 3.15 of the Estate Agent's Code of Conduct speaks of an estate agent's being "in the service of" another estate agent "as . . . an independent contractor." Item 3 of the Specification of Services said that "a person rendering any of the aforesaid services [in paras (a)(i), (a)(ii) or (a)(iii) of the definition of 'estate agent' in the Act] as an independent contractor shall be deemed to do so as an employee of an estate agent." Delport suggests that the purpose of the Notice was to rectify the problem which arose as a result of the introduction of the expression "independent contractor" in section 26 of the Act. Kerr does not think that "deeming" all independent agents and mandataries (if that is what is meant in this context by "independent contractors") to be "employees" either "solves, or is a suitable way to solve, the problem." Section 26 of the Act was intended to ensure that all those practising as estate agents had fidelity fund certificates. It referred to "an independent contractor rendering services to" an estate agent. "Rendering services" appears to Kerr to have been be used in the general sense; "it does not appear to mean that independent agents have contracts of locatio conductio operarum."

== Agency powers ==
An agent is empowered primarily to carry out some or all of the following acts:

- most commonly, conclude contracts for the principal and thereby acquire personal rights for the principal as against third parties and incur obligations on the part of the principal in respect of third parties;
- receive performance of third parties' obligations to the principal, and thereby extinguish the obligations and, in the case of receiving property, acquire real rights for the principal;
- perform the principal's obligations to third parties, and thereby discharge the obligations and, in the case of delivering property to third parties, extinguish the principal's real rights.

== Scope of agency ==
Agents are classified as special or general. A special agent is one engaged by a principal for a particular transaction or specific, limited purpose. A general agent is one authorised to act for a principal in all transactions of a particular nature, or in all matters concerning a particular business, or in all transactions that the principal could perform personally.

== Agents and other fiduciaries ==
The term agent is often applied indiscriminately to any person who performs some act on behalf of another, and who, in a loose sense, represents that person. Such "agents" are then classified according to the nature of the acts they perform. However, many of these "agents" are not, in law, agents because they lack the power to bind their principals, which is the distinctive element of agency. Instead, they are merely fiduciaries.

The following persons act in a fiduciary capacity but not as agents sensu stricto:

- Brokers facilitate communication between parties engaged in negotiations to conclude a contract. The broker, as such, does not have the power to conclude the contract on behalf of either of the parties.
- Factors sell their principals' goods, the possession of which has been consigned to them. The factor usually contracts in their own name with the buyer and thus incurs personal liability under the contract.
- Del credere agents sell their principals' goods and undertake to indemnify their principals in the event of the purchaser breaching the contract. This undertaking commonly entails guaranteeing payment of the purchase price.
- Auctioneers sell their principal's property by public auction.
- Estate agents negotiate the sale of immovable property. The estate agent is generally engaged merely to find a suitable buyer, not to conclude the sale on the principal's behalf. An estate agent is not, strictly speaking, even a mandatary, since he is not under any obligation to execute the task entrusted; there is merely an incentive for the estate agent to do so, in the form of an opportunity to earn a commission.
- Attorneys enforce, defend, or settle their clients' rights or claims against adverse third parties, either in or out of court.
- Notaries draft wills, draw up and attest antenuptial contracts, notarial bonds, donations, prospecting contracts and mining leases, and other instruments for their clients.
- Conveyancers prepare deeds of transfer, certificates of title, and mortgage bonds for registration on their clients' behalf.
- Advocates are authorised to conduct trial proceedings on their clients' behalf.
- Guardians and curators manage the affairs of persons incompetent to do so themselves.
- Executors liquidate and distribute deceased persons' estates.
- Administrators or testamentary trustees manage deceased persons' property, invest their funds, and apply the income in accordance with the provisions of wills.
- Trustees and liquidators in insolvency liquidate and distribute insolvent persons' estates.
- Trustees under inter vivos trust deeds administer assets and funds settled on them, for the benefit of others.
- Trust companies and boards of executors administer deceased and insolvent persons' estates; raise loans and invest capital on behalf of principals; and generally conduct agency work of all kinds, including buying, selling and letting of immovable property.

== Agent's authority ==
The agent's authority to represent the principal constitutes the essence of commercial agency which may be formed in a number of ways. The principal may authorise the agent by express or implied appointment. Generally, the acts of an "agent" without actual authority cannot bind the principal. The principal may, however, be estopped from denying the agent's authority. The principal may also ratify the agent's unauthorised acts.

=== Actual authority ===
There is only one source of authority recognised in South African law: actual (factual) authority.

==== Agency by appointment ====
===== Express authority =====
The principal may expressly appoint authority on the agent to perform juristic acts on the principal's behalf. The appointment is a unilateral juristic act whereby authority is declared in clear, direct, and definite terms. It indicates to third parties the principal's intention to be bound by the agent's acts performed within the scope of the authority appointed. Although it is frequently linked with, or evidenced by, a contract between the principal and agent, the appointment is a distinct juristic act: the authority of the agent is derived not from the contract but from the appointment it embodies.

Generally, no formalities are required for an agent's authorisation; an oral appointment will suffice. Written appointment usually takes the form of a "power of attorney." A power of attorney is a legal instrument setting out the powers conferred on the agent, and may be either special or general. A power of attorney is legally required in only a few cases, namely when required by some law or regulation, or established practice, for example to appoint an attorney to prosecute an appeal in the High Court, or a conveyancer to pass transfer of a mortgage bond, or an agent to represent a principal in a contract for the alienation of land. Where a company concludes a contract that must be in writing, the person signing as or for the company does not have to be appointed in writing for the transaction to be binding.

Since the power of attorney readily and conveniently furnishes proof of an agent's authority, banking and financial institutions, and businesspersons generally, usually require agents to exhibit powers of attorney before entering into transactions with them.

Although there is no general law prescribing formalities for powers of attorney, there are requirements for powers of attorney for certain specific purposes. For example, if the power of attorney is to be used in a deeds registry, it must be attested either by two witnesses above the age of fourteen years and competent to give evidence in a court of law, or by a magistrate, justice of the peace, commissioner of oaths or notary public, but no person who derives any benefit under such power of attorney may attest it. A power of attorney, whether special or general, is no longer subject to stamp duty. General powers of attorney, and also powers of attorney to carry out a series of acts or transactions, may be registered in the Deeds Registry.

===== Tacit authority =====
An agent's authority to perform juristic acts on the principal's behalf may be conferred impliedly: that is, rather by conduct than by the spoken or written word. Whether such a tacit authority exists is a question of fact, dependent on the principal's intention, and is to be inferred from the agent's words and conduct, and from admissible evidence of surrounding circumstances. For example, persons who appoint others to manage their general dealer's business usually intend to confer authority to enter into all such transactions as are reasonably incidental to the management of the business, even if this is not expressly stated. The authority does not arise by operation of law, as is sometimes suggested. Rather, it is a question of the principal's intention and arises by implied agreement, by custom or industry practice, or is inferred as being reasonably necessary to carry out express authority ("incidental authority").

Tacit authority is a form of actual authority. It is no less effective, once proved, than express authority. It should not, however, be confused with the so-called "ostensible" or "apparent" authority encountered when a principal is estopped from denying the agent's authority, to protect the interests of third parties. Instead, it is the agent who must acknowledge the agency relationship, to protect the principal's interests.

==== Involuntary agency ====
In some cases, where there is no express or implied appointment, a person may have authority (or, more properly, power) by operation of law to represent another. This is not agency in the conventional sense, but rather juristic representation. The person's power to represent the other is, in these cases, derived not from manifestation of consent but from an appointment or office, or from a relationship between the parties. The primary examples of such representatives are:

- a partner for co-partners in a partnership;
- a company board of directors for the company;
- a guardian for a ward or pupil;
- a curator for a prodigal or a mentally ill person;
- state officials for the state; and
- a trustee for an insolvent estate.

=== Agency by estoppel ===
Where an agent does not have actual authority, and the principal's words or conduct may be such as to prevent the principal in law, or to estop the principal, from denying that the agent has authority. Where Arthur misleads Kallis by words or by conduct that could reasonably be expected to mislead into believing that Boucher has authority to act for Arthur, and Kallis, relying, reasonably where there is no intention or negligence on Arthur's part, on Arthur's representation, enters into a transaction with Boucher to Kallis's prejudice, then Arthur will be precluded from denying that Boucher had authority. Arthur will be bound by the resulting contract as if Boucher had had the necessary authority to conclude such a transaction on Arthur's behalf, even though Boucher did not actually have such authority. An example of such conduct would be if Arthur allowed Boucher to receive money for Arthur from Kallis on a number of occasions. If, then, on a subsequent occasion, Boucher again received money from Kallis, but failed to pay it over to Arthur, Arthur could not claim that amount from Kallis on the basis that it was owing because Arthur had not received payment. Arthur is precluded by Arthur's previous conduct from denying that Boucher had authority to receive the payment on Arthur's behalf. In other words, Arthur is estopped from denying that Boucher acted as Arthur's agent in receiving the money from Kallis. In paying Boucher, Kallis is deemed to have paid Arthur and has discharged the obligation.

=== Agency by ratification ===
If Boucher, without express or implied authority, enters into a transaction on Arthur's behalf, Arthur may, after a full disclosure of all the facts, ratify the transaction. The ratification may be express or implied. The effect of a valid ratification is to cloak the purported agent's unauthorised acts with authority retrospectively, establishing the relationship of principal and agent after the fact with retroactive effect, with the usual consequences of agency.

This power of ratification, however, can be exercised only if two conditions are satisfied:

1. if Boucher professed to be acting as an agent, representing to the third party that he was acting on behalf of a principal; and
2. if, at the time of the transaction, Arthur was actually in existence.

A principal may not ratify a transaction in part and repudiate it in part. If the principal elects to ratify the transaction, the entire transaction must be ratified, not merely selected parts of it. Ratification by the principal may be implied if, for example, with full knowledge of the facts, the principal accepts some benefit under the transaction, or even, in some cases, deliberately maintains silence and fails to repudiate the transaction within a reasonable time.

== Legal effect of agency ==
=== Principal-agent relationship ===
The terms of the contract between the principal and agent govern their legal relations.

==== Agent's obligations ====
The agent must perform the task entrusted by the principal

- personally;
- in accordance with instructions;
- with reasonable care, skill and diligence;
- in good faith;
- must render an account to the principal; and
- must deliver any proceeds of the mandate.

===== Personal performance =====
An agent must perform the mandate in person. Except with the principal's express or implied consent, the agent may not delegate duties or engage a sub-agent. Where, however, such delegation is necessary to carry out the agency, or is customary in the ordinary course of business, a tacit agreement to delegate may be inferred. Where the agent justifiably engages a sub-agent, privity of contract does not arise between the principal and the sub-agent, unless it can be shown that they intended to bind themselves to each other.

===== Obedience to principal's instructions =====
An agent must act in accordance with, and within the limits of, the authority conferred by the principal, whether express or implied. If an agent, either negligently or fraudulently, fails to perform the mandate or performs it improperly, and thereby causes loss to the principal, the agent is liable to the principal in damages.

The agent is also liable to the principal in damages if the agent causes loss to the principal while acting within the scope of the agent's ostensible authority, but in excess of the principal's instructions.

===== Care, skill and diligence =====
An agent must carry out instructions with due care, skill and diligence. The standard of care is that of a reasonable and prudent person in the circumstances. Where the performance of the mandate requires special knowledge, skill or qualifications, the agent, by undertaking to carry out the mandate, impliedly warrants possession of the requisite knowledge, skill and qualifications.

===== Good faith =====
An agent must carry out his or her duties in good faith. Broadly speaking, this means that the agent must conduct the principal's affairs in the principal's interests and not for the agent's benefit. A number of specific duties are included in this broadly stated duty.

An agent must not allow his interests and duties to conflict with each other. If, for example, the agent is engaged to buy property, the agent may not sell his own property to the principal. If engaged to sell the principal's property, the agent may not purchase it. Without the principal's knowledge and consent, the agent may not acquire any personal profit or benefit, other than any remuneration due in terms of the agency. Where a house owner authorised an agent to sell the house for £2,000, and the agent, knowing that a third party was willing to pay that amount, persuaded the owner to sell the house to the agent for £1,800, and immediately then sold the house to the third party for £2,000, the owner was held to be entitled to claim the difference of £200 from the agent. Likewise, an agent instructed to sell property for a specified sum net is not entitled to retain any surplus if he succeeds in obtaining a higher price.

===== Account by agent =====
An agent must render to the principal an account of all that the agent has done in connection with the authorized transaction. In addition, the agent is under a continuing obligation to allow the principal to inspect books and relevant vouchers relating to authorised transactions.

===== Delivery of proceeds of mandate =====
An agent must deliver all the property, together with its benefits or accessories, or documents, to the principal and must pay the principal all the proceeds received in connection with the transaction. This includes all "secret profits" made by the agent. An agent who uses the proceeds, including moneys, received from the transaction for that agent's own purposes is guilty of theft.

If a duly-authorised agent has transacted in the name of a principal, any property received by the agent belongs to the principal. No further delivery to the principal is necessary to pass ownership to the principal. Equally, if the agent contracts in the name of the principal, the latter becomes a party to the contract, and no cession of rights to the principal is necessary.

==== Principal's obligations ====
The obligations of the principal to the agent are

- to pay the agent's remuneration;
- to refund expenses; and
- to indemnify the agent.

===== Agent's remuneration =====
The principal must pay the agent the agreed, usual or reasonable remuneration or commission. As a rule, the agent is entitled to remuneration only if the whole mandate has, or all the services agreed have, been completed or substantially performed.

There is no substantial performance by the agent where, for example, the principal instructs the agent to sell land, and the agent sells the land to a person prohibited by law from purchasing it. In such a case, the agent is not entitled to any remuneration. Nor is the agent entitled to commission where the principal is willing to sell the property for a fixed sum, free of commission, and the agent sells the property for the fixed sum only. In the case of estate agents, the usual agreement is that the agent is entitled to commission if the principal actually enters into a contract with a person introduced by the agent. An agent cannot claim commission for the mere introduction of a person willing and able to contract on the principal's terms, unless an agreement to that effect is proved. In the case of a mandate "to find a purchaser," the agent's commission is usually payable on completion of a valid sale.

If the agent substantially performs the mandate, the agent is entitled to remuneration even though the principal negligently or intentionally fails to take the benefit of the services. Even if the agent has not completed the mandate, the agent is entitled to remuneration where prevented by the wrongful act or dolus of the principal from so doing. Likewise, the agent is entitled to commission where the transaction was completed by another person, but the agent performed the acts that were the efficient cause, or causa causans, of the transaction, although not, of course, if the agent's services were not the efficient cause of the transaction.

If the agent has performed the mandate, but the services have not been duly and faithfully rendered, the agent forfeits the right to remuneration or commission—for example, if the agent is instructed to sell the principal's property and buys it, or takes a secret commission.

====== Amount of remuneration ======
The amount of the remuneration may be fixed by agreement, expressly or impliedly, either on a time basis, or in a definite sum of money, or as a percentage of the value of the subject matter of the transaction, in which case the remuneration is known as "commission." In the absence of an agreement, the amount of remuneration is regulated, in the case of regular agents, such as auctioneers, estate agents, brokers and factors, by the custom or trade usage of the particular business or kind of agency, and the amount is almost invariably calculated on a percentage basis. Casual agents, to whose services a tariff is not applicable, are entitled to an amount reasonable in the circumstances, sometimes referred to as a quantum meruit. The agent, in return, may claim from the principal an account supported by vouchers if that is necessary to enable the agent to formulate the claim for remuneration.

===== Agent's expenses =====
The principal must refund to the agent all expenses reasonably and properly incurred by the agent in carrying out the mandate, including interest on outlays and advances necessarily made by the agent in its execution.

===== Indemnity =====
The principal must indemnify the agent for all loss or liability duly incurred by the agent in the execution of the mandate, or directly caused to the agent by the execution.

== Relations between principal and third persons ==
The relations between the principal and third persons vary according to whether the agent, in concluding a transaction, has

- acted within the scope of the authority granted and has disclosed the fact that he acted as an agent; or
- exceeded the authority; or
- concealed his capacity; or
- acted corruptly.

=== Agent acts within authority ===
Where an agent has disclosed that he acts for a principal, and has acted within the scope of the express or implied authority conferred, a transaction effected by the agent with a third party is binding as between the principal and the third person. There is no necessity for the agent to cede any rights to the principal, because the principal, as party to the contract with the third party, may enforce his or her own rights under the contract. Equally, liability under the contract is imposed directly on the principal who may be sued by the third party. No benefit or liability under the transaction attaches to the agent. Even if the agent has not acted in the interests of the principal, or has actually defrauded the principal, the latter is bound by the transaction, if the third person was not a party to the irregularity, and if the agent acted in fact within the express or implied scope of his authority.

=== Agent exceeds authority ===
Where the agent exceeds the express or implied authority in transacting, the principal is not bound by the transaction. If, however, the principal has been enriched by or has benefited from the transaction at the expense of the third party, the principal is bound to the third party to the extent that the principal has been enriched. The principal is not obliged to accept such benefit, and may make restitution.

On the other hand, where the agent has acted within his ostensible authority, but has, unknown to the third party, exceeded the private instructions of the principal, the principal is bound by the transaction based on estoppel. The principal has, however, a right of action against the agent for any loss sustained by the principal.

Where an agent, in the course of his engagement, acquires knowledge of some fact that it is his or her duty to communicate to the principal, and fails to do so, the notice is imputed to the principal. Only actual, and not constructive, knowledge of the agent can be imputed to the principal.

=== Agent conceals capacity (undisclosed principal) ===
If an agent does not disclose to a third party that he is acting as agent, and concludes a contract with the third party as if he were the principal in the transaction, the third party may treat the contract as binding on the agent. The third party may sue the agent, as principal, on the contract; equally the agent may, as principal, sue the third party on the contract. When, however, the undisclosed principal discovers that the contract that he in fact authorised has been concluded, he may adopt it, and may consequently sue the third party on it. Equally, the third party, on discovering the undisclosed principal, may sue the principal on the contract. it follows that the third party has a choice or an election to sue either the agent or the undisclosed principal, when discovered; but having elected to sue one of them the third party is debarred from suing the other, even if he or she sues the agent before being aware that there is a principal. The third party may be sued on the contract by either the principal or agent, but not by both, the principal having the preferential right to do so.

The position of the undisclosed principal is altogether different from that of the unnamed principal. Where an agent discloses that he or she is acting as agent but does not disclose the identity of that principal, the normal rules of representation apply: The contract creates rights and obligations for the unnamed principal and the third party, not for the agent.

=== Agent acts corruptly ===
Where the agent is given or promised a secret benefit by the third party to a contract that is intended to influence the agent in that party's favour, the gift is a bribe, and the principal has the choice of repudiating the contract or affirming it, and obtaining such relief as the court may think adequate.

== Relations between agent and third parties ==
=== Agent ===
Where the agent has concluded a transaction with a third party within the scope of the agent's authority, no rights or obligations ensue as between the agent and the third party. For example, if Arthur, in his capacity as the lawful agent of Boucher, borrows money from Kallis, Arthur is not liable to repay the money to Kallis, and cannot be sued by Kallis for it.

In the following cases, however, an agent is liable personally on the contract:

- where the agent agreed to be personally liable; and
- where the agent did not disclose to the third party that he or she was acting as an agent.

Where an "agent" acts on behalf of a "principal" who does not exist, or lacks legal capacity, it is sometimes said that the "agent" is liable personally on the contract. This proposition holds good only when it can be shown, as a matter of construction, that the so-called agent in fact acted as a principal party to the contract. Of course, if the "agent" was aware of the true state of affairs, and acted fraudulently, the agent may be held liable in delict. "So too, perhaps, if the agent acted negligently." If the agent warranted that he or she had authority to act for the principal, the agent may be held liable for breach of warranty of authority.

=== Agent exceeds authority ===
Where the agent exceeds his authority in concluding a contract, the agent is liable to the third party, not on the contract, but for damages for breach of an implied warranty of authority. The measure of damages claimable by the third party is the amount of loss sustained by the third party because of the non-performance of the intended contract by the principal.

== Termination of agent's authority ==
Since the authorisation and the contract of mandate are distinct juristic acts, the rules that govern the termination of the agent's authority to bind the principal are not necessarily the same as those governing the termination of the contractual relationship between the principal and agent. The contract of mandate may be terminated by any of the methods applicable to contracts generally: for example, by performance or by the mutual consent of the parties. An executory contract of mandate may, however, generally be terminated by the unilateral act of either party—revocation by the mandatory (principal) or renunciation by the mandatary (agent)—unless the express or implied terms of the contract dictate otherwise. This rule, which runs contrary to accepted contractual principles, is derived from the common law, where mandate was essentially a gratuitous contract. In modern law, the mandatary is usually remunerated for services rendered; in such cases, at least, it is doubtful whether the contract is freely terminable at either party's will.

An agent's authority to conclude juristic acts on behalf of the principal may be terminated by any of the following occurrences:

- performance of the authorised transaction;
- effluxion of time, which may occur if a time limit has been fixed by the parties, or, in the absence of a stipulated time, when a reasonable time has elapsed;
- death of the principal, or the principal's insanity, insolvency, or attainment of majority;
- death of the agent or the agent's insanity; and
- revocation by the principal. Save for certain possible exceptions, discussed below, the principal may summarily revoke the agent's authority to perform a juristic act on the principal's behalf, if the act in question has not already been performed. This is so even if the authority is expressed to be irrevocable. If Arthur, for example, engages Boucher to find a suitable person to buy Arthur's house, and authorises Boucher to sell the house, Arthur may revoke the authority granted to Boucher. After such revocation, Boucher cannot bind Arthur to a sale of the house, though Boucher may claim damages from Arthur for breach of contract. In order to be effective as against interested third parties, however, the revocation of authority must be communicated to such third parties.

=== Irrevocable authority ===
The question of whether an authority conclude a juristic act on behalf of another can be granted irrevocably is a controversial one. It has been held, in a number of cases, that an authority is irrevocable, in the strict sense, where the agent is appointed procurator in rem suam: that is, where the agent is authorised to do an act for the agent's own benefit, and not for the principal's; or, as it is generally styled, the authority is "coupled with an interest" or "forms part of a security," for example, where an agent is authorised to pass a bond in his own favour over the principal's property. This proposition reflects Anglo-American rather than Roman-Dutch law, which consistently refused to recognise the validity of a procurator in rem suam mentioned by Voet. Such a procurator was, in Voet's time, no more than a cessionary, and, of course, the cedent lacked the power to revoke the cession unilaterally. Whether the Supreme Court of Appeal will accept that an authority "coupled with an interest" is irrevocable remains to be seen. "The better view," writes Graham Bradfield, "appears to be that an authority is always revocable, even if it is linked with a contract of mandate, which cannot be terminated unilaterally." Of course, if the principal has contracted not to revoke the authority, but does so, the principal will be liable in damages for breach of contract.

== See also ==
- Contract
- Law of South Africa
- Law of obligations
