= Royal Caribbean Group =

Cruise holding company headquartered in Miami, Florida

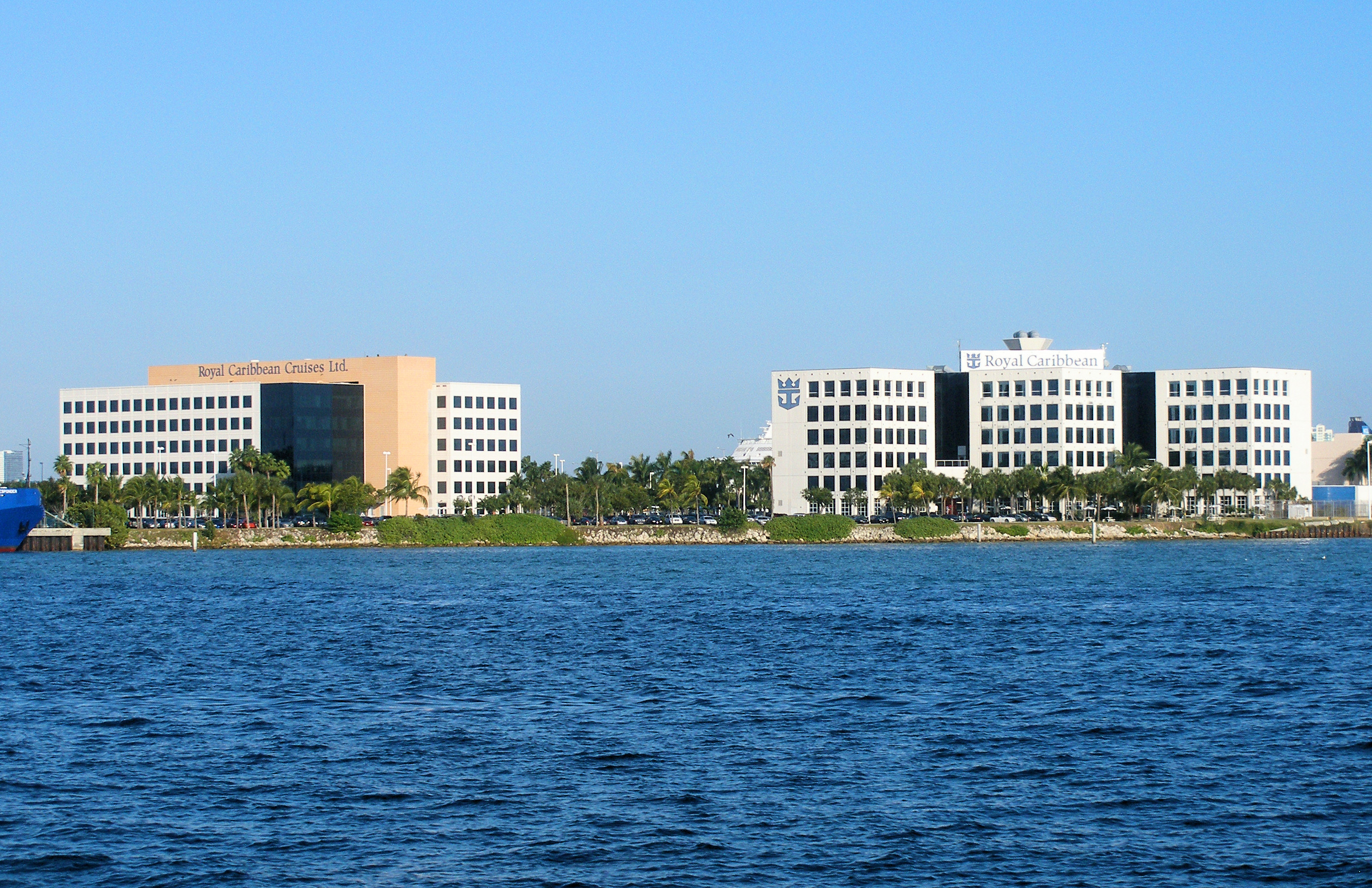
- Royal Caribbean Group headquarters in Miami, Florida
- Formerly: Royal Caribbean Cruises Ltd.
- Type: Public
- Traded as: NYSE: RCL; S&P 500 component
- ISIN: LR0008862868
- Industry: Hospitality; Travel; Tourism
- Founded: 1969; 57 years ago
- Founders: Sigurd Skaugen; Arne Wilhelmsen; Gotaas Larsen
- Headquarters: 25.7753°N 80.1780°W, Miami, Florida, U.S.
- Area served: Worldwide
- Key people: Jason Liberty; (Chairman & CEO); Naftali Holtz; (CFO)
- Services: Cruises
- Revenue: ▲US$17.9 billion (2025)
- Operating income: ▲US$4.91 billion (2025)
- Net income: ▲US$4.29 billion (2025)
- Total assets: ▲US$41.6 billion (2025)
- Total equity: ▲US$10.2 billion (2025)
- Number of employees: 108,000 (2025)
- Subsidiaries: Royal Caribbean International; Celebrity Cruises; Silversea Cruises; TUI Cruises (50%); Hapag-Lloyd cruises (50%)
- Website: royalcaribbeangroup.com

Royal Caribbean Group, formerly known as Royal Caribbean Cruises Ltd., is a cruise holding company headquartered in Miami, Florida, United States and incorporated in Liberia. It is the world's second-largest cruise line operator, after Carnival Corporation & plc. As of September 2025, Royal Caribbean Group fully owns three cruise lines: Royal Caribbean International, Celebrity Cruises, and Silversea Cruises. It also holds a 50% stake in TUI Cruises, which operates Mein Schiff and Hapag-Lloyd Cruises, with the Group's global fleet consisting of 71 ships.

== History ==
Royal Caribbean was founded in 1969 in Norway. Royal Caribbean Group was formed as Royal Caribbean Cruises Ltd. in 1997 when Royal Caribbean Cruise Line purchased Celebrity Cruises. The decision was made to keep the two cruise line brands separate following the merger; as a result Royal Caribbean Cruise Line was re-branded Royal Caribbean International and Royal Caribbean Cruises Ltd. was established as the new parent company of both Royal Caribbean International and Celebrity Cruises.

A third brand under Royal Caribbean Cruises ownership was formed in 2000 when Island Cruises was created as a joint venture with First Choice Holidays. Island Cruises became an informal cruise line on the British and Brazilian markets.

In November 2006, Royal Caribbean Cruises purchased Pullmantur Cruises based in Madrid, Spain. From there, the company expanded with the creation of Celebrity Cruises subsidiary, Azamara Cruises, in 2007. It followed this with the formation of CDF Croisières de France in May 2008 to serve the French-language market.

Royal Caribbean also has an interest in TUI Cruises, a joint venture with TUI AG, which began operations in 2009 aimed at a German-speaking market. TUI Cruises' subsidiary, TUI Travel, had a 50% interest in Island Cruises following their merger with First Choice Holidays in 2007. In October 2008, Royal Caribbean Cruises rationalized their holdings by selling their share of Island Cruises to TUI.

In 2016, Royal Caribbean sold 51% of Pullmantur and CDF to Cruises Investment Holdings S.A.R.L.

In early 2019, Royal Caribbean announced in a joint venture with ITM Group the formation of Holistica, a cruise destination development company. The company developed the Grand Lucayan Resort, located in Freeport.

On July 10, 2020, Royal Caribbean Cruises purchased the remaining shares of Silversea Cruises. That same month, it also changed its name to Royal Caribbean Group. It also adjusted its logo. Royal Caribbean sold Azamara Cruises to Sycamore Partners in March 2021 for $201 million.

In July 2022, Royal Caribbean Group received court approval to purchase Endeavor, a former Crystal Cruise ship, for $275 million. The ship was renamed Silver Endeavour when it officially joins the Royal Caribbean's subsidiary, Silversea Cruises' fleet.

On February 1, 2024, Royal Caribbean Group broke ground on a new headquarters building between its two existing headquarters buildings at PortMiami.

== Brands and ships ==
=== Royal Caribbean International ===
Royal Caribbean International (RCI) is a cruise line founded in 1969 in Norway. It reorganized as a wholly owned subsidiary in 1997 and was renamed to Royal Caribbean Group in 2020.

Based in Miami, Florida, it is the largest cruise line by revenue and second largest by passenger counts. As of 2025, Royal Caribbean International controlled 27.0% of the worldwide cruise market by passengers and 24.8% by revenue.

List of Royal Caribbean International ships

- Grandeur of the Seas
- Enchantment of the Seas
- Rhapsody of the Seas
- Vision of the Seas
- Voyager of the Seas
- Explorer of the Seas
- Adventure of the Seas
- Navigator of the Seas
- Mariner of the Seas
- Radiance of the Seas
- Brilliance of the Seas
- Serenade of the Seas
- Jewel of the Seas
- Freedom of the Seas
- Liberty of the Seas
- Independence of the Seas
- Oasis of the Seas
- Allure of the Seas
- Harmony of the Seas
- Symphony of the Seas
- Wonder of the Seas
- Utopia of the Seas
- Quantum of the Seas
- Anthem of the Seas
- Ovation of the Seas
- Spectrum of the Seas
- Odyssey of the Seas
- Icon of the Seas
- Star of the Seas
- Legend of the Seas

=== Celebrity Cruises ===
Celebrity Cruises is a cruise line headquartered in Miami, Florida, and is a wholly owned subsidiary of Royal Caribbean Group. Celebrity Cruises was founded in 1988 by the Greece-based Chandris Group, and merged with Royal Caribbean Cruise Line in 1997.

List of Celebrity Cruises ships

- Celebrity Apex
- Celebrity Ascent
- Celebrity Beyond
- Celebrity Eclipse
- Celebrity Edge
- Celebrity Equinox
- Celebrity Reflection
- Celebrity Silhouette
- Celebrity Solstice
- Celebrity Xcel
- Celebrity Constellation
- Celebrity Infinity
- Celebrity Flora
- Celebrity Millennium
- Celebrity Summit

Celebrity River Cruises

In 2025, Celebrity Cruises announced the addition of Celebrity River Cruises and an initial order of 10 river cruise ships. In 2026, company officials confirmed the fleet intends to operate at least 20 ships by 2031. The first two ships, the Celebrity Compass and Celebrity Seeker, scheduled to begin sailing in 2027 on the Rhine and Danube rivers.

=== Silversea Cruises ===
Silversea Cruises is a luxury cruise line headquartered in Monaco. It was founded in 1994 by Antonio Lefebvre d'Ovidio and V-Ships (formerly Vlasov Group). In 2018, Royal Caribbean Group acquired a 66.7% stake in Silversea Cruises, adding ultra-luxury and expedition cruising to its portfolio. In 2020, the company acquired the remaining shares of Silversea Cruises, becoming the sole owner.

List of Silversea Cruises ships

- Silver Cloud
- Silver Nova
- Silver Ray
- Silver Wind
- Silver Shadow
- Silver Whisper
- Silver Spirit
- Silver Muse
- Silver Moon
- Silver Dawn
- Silver Endeavour

== Other significant investments ==
=== Holistica Destinations ===
Holistica Destinations was formed in early 2019 as a joint venture between Royal Caribbean Group and the ITM Group with the intention of purchasing the Grand Lucayan Resort and re-developing the neighbouring Freeport Harbour in The Bahamas as a cruise destinations that would benefit the local Freeport economy. However, the Government of the Bahamas withdrew support for the re-development of the Grand Lucayan Resort citing that it was 'not in the best interests of the Bahamian people'. Holistica continues to plan for a Freeport Harbour re-development.

Holistica also operates three other Caribbean cruise destinations. These are Costa Maya in Mexico, Roatan in Honduras, and Puerto Plata in the Dominican Republic.

=== Grand Bahama Shipyard ===
Grand Bahama Shipyard is a ship maintenance facility located in Freeport, the Bahamas. Royal Caribbean Group holds a 40% stake. Other investors include Carnival Corporation (40% stake) and the Grand Bahama Port Authority (20% stake), and MSC Cruises.

Royal Caribbean Group and Carnival Corporation announced a joint investment of $350 million in the shipyard in 2021, partly in response to damage suffered to the facility after an incident involving the collapse of two cranes during maintenance on Oasis of the Seas and damages caused by Hurricane Dorian, both occurring in 2019.

=== iCON Infrastructure partnership ===
Royal Caribbean Group and iCON Infrastructure entered a partnership in 2022 to own, manage, and develop strategic cruise port infrastructure in home ports and key ports of call. The partnership includes Royal Caribbean International-operated Terminal A in PortMiami, as well as several development projects in Spain, Italy, and the U.S. Virgin Islands. Royal Caribbean Group holds a 10% stake.

== Strategic partnership with Meyer Turku and Finland ==
In December 2022, Royal Caribbean announced a strategic partnership with Meyer Turku and the government of Finland to engage in sustainable shipbuilding in Finland.

== Former brands ==
- Island Cruises (50% share, owned 2000–2008)
- CDF Croisières de France (2007–2017)
- SkySea Cruise Lines (35%, 2016–2018)
- Azamara Cruises (2000–2021, sold)
- Pullmantur Cruises (2000–2020, defunct)
- Admiral Cruises (1988–1992)

== Business trend ==
	2016	2017	2018	2019	2020	2021	2022	2023	2024	2025
Total revenue (USD bn)	8.5	8.8	9.5	11.0	2.2	1.5	8.8	13.9	16.5	17.9
Operating income (USD bn)	1.5	1.7	1.9	2.1	-3.1	-3.8	-0.8	2.9	4.1	4.9
Net income (USD bn)	1.3	1.6	1.8	1.9	-5.8	-5.2	-2.2	1.7	2.9	4.3
Total assets (USD bn)	9.1	10.7	11.7	12.7	8.8	5.1	2.9	4.9	7.7	10.2
Total equity (USD bn)	22.3	22.3	27.7	30.3	32.5	32.3	33.8	35.1	37.1	41.6
Employees	65,900	65,900	76,900	85,300	84,900	84,900	102,000	98,100	106,000	108,000
