= Manfredi Lefebvre d'Ovidio =

Italian businessman (born 1953)

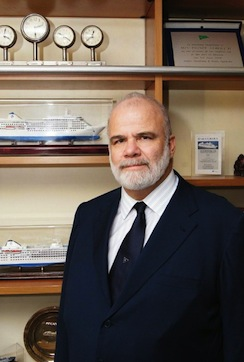
- Born: 30 April 1953 (age 73)
- Education: Sapienza University of Rome (dropped out)
- Occupation: Businessman
- Title: Chairman, Silversea Cruises
- Spouse: Divorced
- Children: 1 daughter
- Parent(s): Antonio Lefebvre d'Ovidio; Eugenia Beck

Manfredi Lefebvre d'Ovidio de Clunieres di Balsorano (born 30 April 1953) is an Italian–Monegasque billionaire businessman. He is the former chairman of Silversea Cruises, a company founded by his father. In June 2018, he sold two-thirds of the company to Royal Caribbean for US$1 billion, retaining a one-third stake.

He is the executive chairman of Abercrombie & Kent Travel Group, a travel conglomerate that owns Abercrombie & Kent, Crystal Cruises, Ecoventura Galapagos, and Cox & Kings.

As of February 2026, Forbes estimated his net worth at US$2.3 billion.

== Biography ==
=== Early life ===
Lefebvre d'Ovidio grew up in Rome, one of four children born into an Italian family. The son of Antonio Lefebvre d'Ovidio, legal professor and Italian jurist, and Eugenia Beck, of German origin. Antonio Lefebvre d'Ovidio in Italy is referred to as "the father of the maritime law" and is also a key figure of the Lockhead scandal, the biggest case of corruption in times of the First Republic.

Manfredi Lefebvre was involved in a variety of family businesses from an early age and in 2001 became chairman of luxury cruise line, Silversea Cruises. He had two sisters, Elvira and Maria Desiderata (Maruzza), and an elder brother, Francesco (b. 1951).

== Career ==
In the 1980s, Antonio Lefebvre d'Ovidio founded a shipping company that helped European migrants to move to Australia. With the time, the company shifted from the passenger sector to the cruise industry, and finally in 1994, Silversea Cruises was launched, with two ships purpose-built for the line: the Silver Cloud and the Silver Wind.

In 1988 they purchased control of Sitmar Cruises from the Vlasov family and in 1989, merged it with P&O's Princess Cruises unit.

Manfredi Lefebvre d'Ovidio led Silversea through his board position before being named chairman in 2001.

He was executive chairman of Silversea Cruises from 2001 to 2020.

By that time, it added two more vessels (Silver Whisper and Silver Shadow) making it a four ship fleet. As of 2017 Silversea operated nine vessels on worldwide itineraries that call in all seven continents. It has been recognized as one of the World's best with multiple awards from Condé Nast Traveler and Travel + Leisure magazines as well as other travel publications and organizations. Manfredi Lefebvre d'Ovidio was the sole owner of Silversea, until June 2018, when Royal Caribbean agreed to pay about US$1 billion for a two-thirds stake in the company. In August 2018, Bloomberg assessed Lefebvre d'Ovidio as a billionaire. He later stepped down as chairman when the complete takeover was completed, remaining a 2.5% shareholder in Royal Caribbean.

In 2021, he had executive buyouts in Arqit Quantum, a NASDAQ-listed quantum cryptography company. In June 2022, the Lefebvre D'Ovidio family's Abercrombie&Kent Travel Group (A&K Travel Group) bought Crystal Cruises and its two ocean vessels, Crystal Serenity and Crystal Symphony. In the same plan, A&K acquired Cox and King, the world's oldest tour operator and Ecoventura, a company operating its own fleet in the Galapagos Islands. In the same years, the financial group controlled by the Lefèbvre family, Heritage Group, acquired various stakes including 75% of Bucksense Inc, New Cleo, Avatera, Quintessential Beverages, TT, V Dyne, Arqit, Habitas. In June 2022, cruise ships Crystal Serenity and Crystal Symphony were purchased in addition to the Crystal Cruises brand.

In January 2024, he joined the Sovereign Order of Malta when he was appointed as Ambassador at Large of the Order for Culture and Philanthropy.

In May 2025, he was appointed President of Heritage Group. In the same month, Lefebvre was appointed Chair-Elect of the World Travel & Tourism Council (WTTC). He succeeded Greg O'Hara and officially took office at a ceremony held in September 2025.

As of February 2026, his net worth was estimated at US$2.3 billion.

== Lawsuits ==
=== Inheritance disputes ===
In 1998, Antonio Lefebvre decided to split his patrimony to prevent his children from fighting for inheritance. He set up several trusts and transferred there the shares owned by the family, assigning each child a part. However, the step only sparked a legal battle between the brothers Manfredi and Francesco, who later sued his brother and the rest of the family, claiming that the delivery of the shares of the holding company did not go through as agreed. The legal battle lasted more than two decades and ended in favour of Manfredi. In 2023 the Bologna Appeal Court confirmed the first ruling made in 2012, and at the end of 2024 the Court of Cassation rejected Francesco's final appeal.

In 2015 Elvira Lefebvre d'Ovidio sued both Manfredi and Francesco, as well as several companies, claiming to be the sole heir and accusing them of not having the right to manage her assets, including real estate properties and cruise ships. In 2018, Elvira Lefebvre reached an agreement with Manfredi (receiving 30% of the $1.5 bln from selling the Silversea) and withdrew her lawsuit, but the case against Francesco continued. In 2020, the Civil Court of Rome declared her claims against Francesco unfounded and ordered her to pay €500,000 in legal costs. When she pleaded to be unable to pay, the defendants filed a complaint with the Rome Public Prosecutor's Office. On 3 May 2022 the court of Rome acquitted her of wilfully failing to comply with a court order, on the grounds that the alleged offence had not taken place.

=== Casinò di Saint Vincent ===
In 2012, manager of Casinò di Saint Vincent Luca Frigerio filed a criminal complaint against Manfredi Lefebvre d'Ovidio accusing him of embezzlement, fraud and criminal association, in relation to a dispute between the Casinò and the company Veio (formerly Grand Hotel Billia), which had sold the Grand Hotel Billia to the Casino in 2006. According to a filing by his lawyer reported by Milano Finanza, Lefebvre was cleared of all the serious charges: he was neither an administrator nor a partner of Veio, nor a partner of any affiliated company. In the assessment of three magistrates from the Rome Public Prosecutor's Office, the facts reported by the Casinò did not even present the slightest logical basis for constituting a notitia criminis. Lefebvre's lawyer notified Casinò of his intention to seek compensation for damage to Lefebvre's professional image.

== Personal life ==
He resides in Monte Carlo, Monaco. From a marriage to Marzia Mittiga he has a daughter, Costanza.

== Cruise industry advocacy ==
Lefebvre d'Ovidio was a key driver of the unification of the European cruise industry as chairman of the European Cruise Council (ECC) since 2010.

He led the merger of that association with the Cruise Lines International Association (CLIA) of which he has been on the board of directors until 2013. He was also on the board of CLIA Global and chairman of CLIA Europe. He was active in promoting international tourism as vice chairman of the World Travel and Tourism Council (WTTC), in charge for Europe, and as a member of the World Economic Forum (WEF).

== Posts and honorary positions ==
Lefebvre d'Ovidio was made a Knight of the Order of Saint Charles and of the Order of Grimaldi by Prince Albert II of Monaco. His posts and positions include:

- Since April 2019 – Honorary Consul of Ecuador in Monaco;
- Since 2024 – Permanent Observer of the Sovereign Military Order of Malta to the United Nations Education, Scientific and Cultural Organization (UNESCO);
- Ambassador-at-Large for Culture and Philanthropy for the Sovereign Military Order of Malta;
- Chair of the World Travel & Tourism Council since September 2025, previously Vice-President for Africa of its Executive Committee;
- Global Senior Advisor at Rothschild & Co;
- Vice Chairman of Arqit Quantum;
- Member of Gruppo Tecnico del Turismo e della Cultura di Confindustria;
- Board Member of The National Italian American Foundation;
- Vice-President of the Monégasque Chamber of Shipping;
- Vice Chairman of the non-profit organization Abercrombie & Kent Philanthropy;
- Vice-Chairman of the Board of Directors of the Monaco Hydrogen Alliance.

== Philanthropy ==
Fondazione Maruzza Lefebvre D’Ovidio Onlus was established on 7 October 1999, by Antonio and Eugenia Lefebvre in honour of their late daughter Maruzza (Maria Desiderata), who died of cancer in 1989 at the age of 40. The non-profit Foundation was launched to promote the culture of paediatric palliative care, research and training for professionals who care for children with incurable diseases.

In 2013, the Foundation was honoured with Medaglia d'Oro al merito della Sanità Pubblica awarded by the President of Italy.

Manfredi Lefebvre took the presidency of the foundation in 2025. Costanza Lefebvre d’Ovidio, his daughter, is Vice President of the Foundation.
