= Silver Nova =

Ship built in 2023

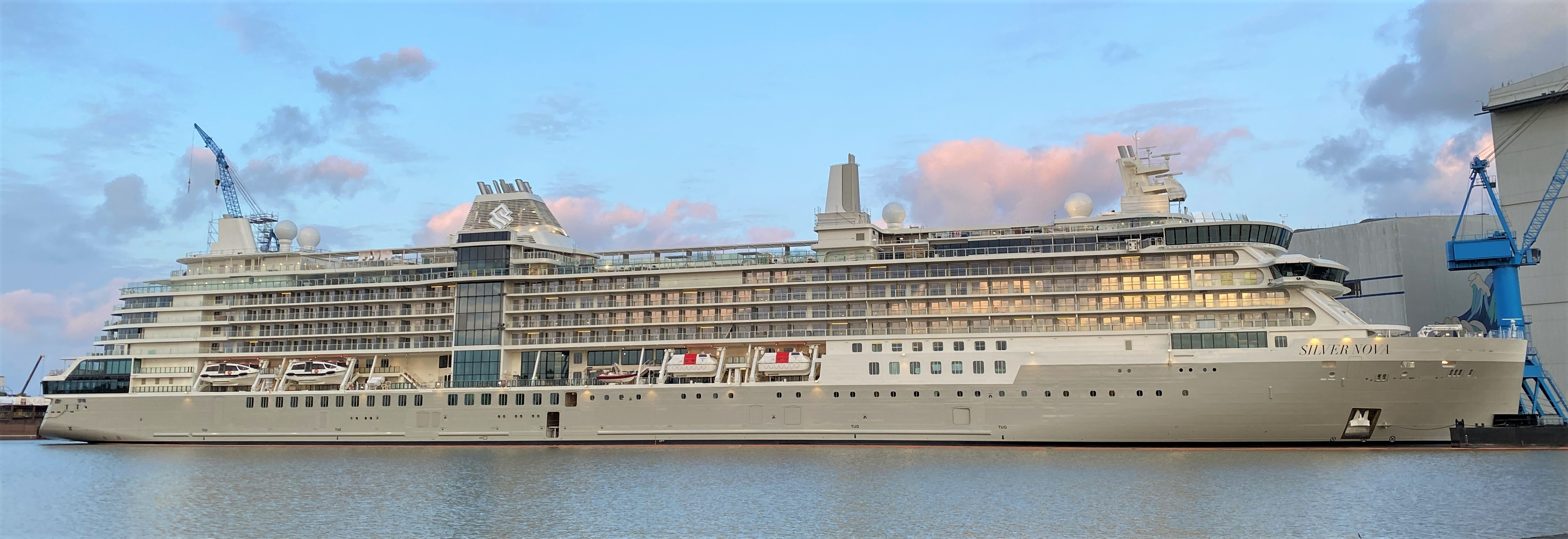
- Silver Nova at Meyer Werft

History
- Name: Silver Nova
- Operator: Silversea Cruises
- Port of registry: Nassau, Bahamas
- Builder: Meyer Werft
- Yard number: S.719
- Launched: 28 April 2023
- Christened: 4 January 2024 by Nina Compton
- Maiden voyage: 14 August 2023
- Identification: Call sign: C6GA5; IMO number: 9886213
- Status: In service

General characteristics
- Type: Cruise ship
- Tonnage: 54,700 GT
- Length: 244.2 m (801 ft 2 in)
- Beam: 29.6 m (97 ft 1 in)
- Decks: 9 total
- Speed: 19 knots (35 km/h; 22 mph)
- Capacity: 728 passengers
- Crew: 556

Silver Nova is a luxury cruise ship, the 12th ship in service with Silversea Cruises. She was ordered in 2018 and completed in 2023. Nova is the first ship in the company's new Evolution-class, and designed with the intent of environmentally friendly cruising. It is the first hybrid luxury cruise ship, powered by a combination of liquefied natural gas (LNG), fuel cell system, and batteries, enabling it to be emissions free when in port. The ship was built at a Meyer Werft in Germany, featuring a unique asymmetrical design.

== Design and construction ==
The Silver Nova was ordered in October 2018 from the Meyer Werft shipyard in Germany, under the name Project Evolution, the first of two ships. It was part of a new ship order under Royal Caribbean, who had acquired a two-thirds stake in the company from Manfredi Lefebvre D’Ovidio earlier in the year. The final ship design dimensions came to a gross tonnage: 54,700, length of 243 meters and 30 meters wide.

The ship features hybrid technology that enables the ship to achieve a 40% reduction in greenhouse gas emissions, and is projected to achieve an Energy Efficiency Design Index rating approximately 25% better than applicable International Maritime Organization requirements. The Silver Nova is designed to operate emission-free in ports, with 4-megawatt fuel cell system as well as batteries. The fuel cells and batteries are designed to supply enough electricity in port to power the hotel operations when the ship is not using shore power.

The public space layout and design was primarily completed by notable cruise ship designers Wilson Butler Architects of Boston and GEM of Genoa. The layout features a unique asymmetrical design, offsetting the engine casing, and allowing for wider connected views to the ocean on the open decks and in public venues. The final ship design has accommodations for 728 passengers in 364 suites and has a crew of 556.

Construction on Silver Nova began in 2021, with the traditional steel cutting ceremony on November 18 in Papenburg at the Meyer Werft shipyard. The ship was floated out on April 28, 2023, and transited the Ems river for final fit out at Eemshaven, Netherlands, on 5 June. In the same month, she wraps up for her sea trials.

== Service history ==
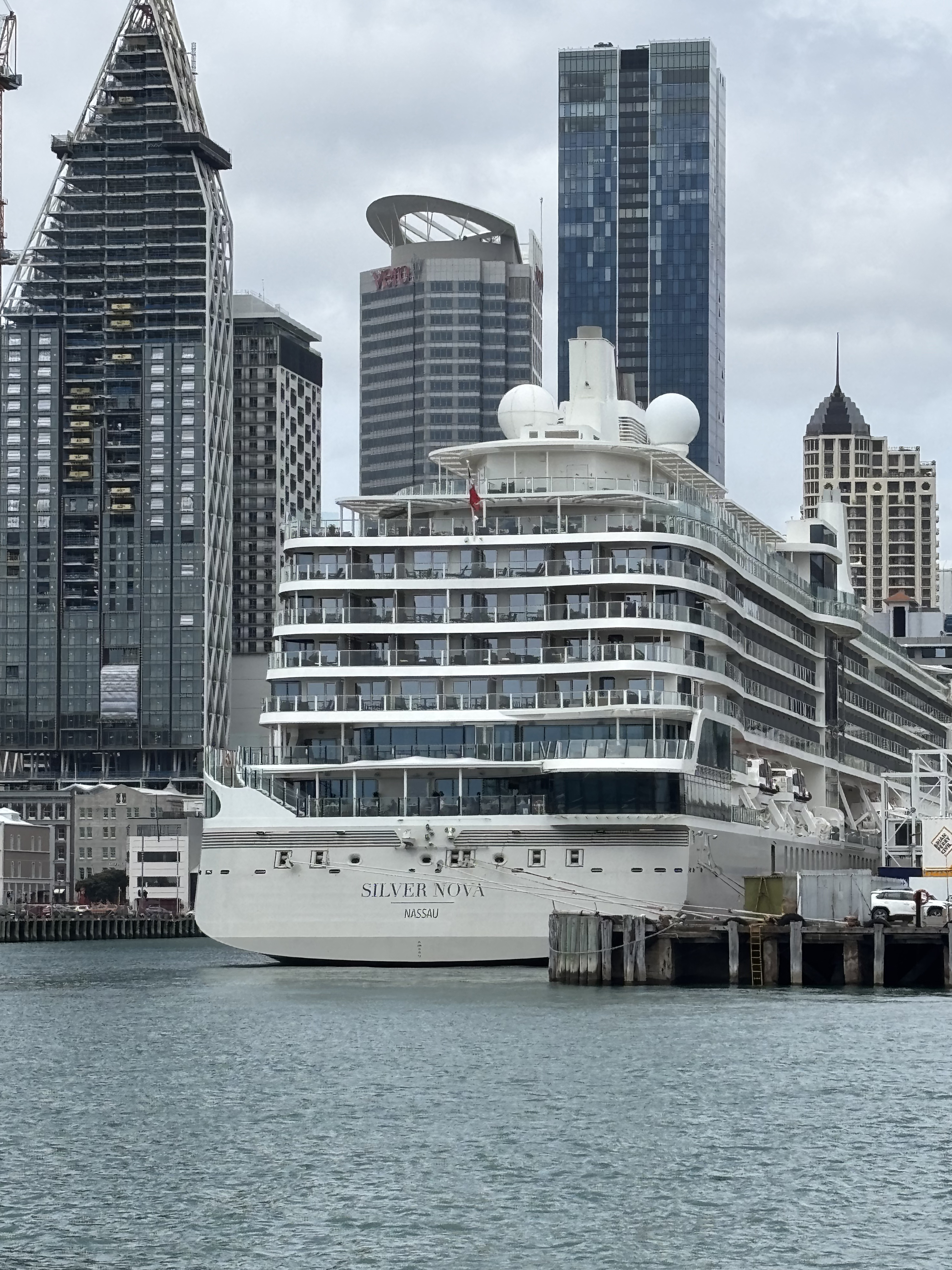
Silver Nova docked at Queens Wharf, Auckland, New Zealand, on 12 December 2025

The Silver Nova was delivered to Silversea cruises on July 20, 2023, at the 12th ship in the Silversea fleet. A preview press cruise was held beginning in Trieste, Italy, with the official maiden voyage schedule for August 14, 2023. The ship was officially christened in Ft Lauderdale, Florida on January 4, 2024, by godmother Chef Nina Compton. The christening was conducted in the Venetian Lounge, and began with the Royal Caribbean Group tradition of bagpipes, along with Broadway actress/singer Rachel York performed the national anthem. The event also coincided with Silversea's 30th Anniversary.

2024 was the ships maiden season in Alaska, that included a photographic exhibition installed on board that comprised 30 images by Steve McCurry. In fall of 2024, the ship repositioned to the Asia-Pacific for her inaugural season, based primarily in Australia. In 2025, the ship would embark on a 47-day voyage circumnavigation of Australia.

== Sister ship ==
The sister ship of the Silver Nova, the Silver Ray, was launched in February 2024. She was delivered in May and christened on 12 June in Lisbon.
