= Dovidio =

Dovidio is an Italian surname. Notable people with the surname include:

- John Dovidio (fl. 1994), American psychologist
- Manfredi Lefebvre d'Ovidio (born 1953), Italian-born Monegasque billionaire
- Joseph F. Dovidio Chemistry and materials science
- Joseph J. Dovidio III, Critical Care Nurse Practitioner specializing in Cardiopulmonary Resuscitation and the care of patients undergoing Cardiothoracic Surgery
