= Silversea Cruises =

Luxury cruise line

Silversea
- Type: Subsidiary
- Industry: Cruises; Hospitality; Travel; Tourism
- Founded: 1994; 32 years ago in Monaco
- Founder: Antonio Lefebvre d'Ovidio
- Headquarters: Fontvieille, Monaco (Executive Offices); Miami, Florida, U.S. (Operations Offices)
- Area served: Worldwide
- Key people: Bert Hernandez (President)
- Products: Cruises
- Parent: Royal Caribbean Group
- Website: silversea.com

Silversea is a luxury cruise line and expedition travel brand headquartered in Monaco. Founded in 1994 by the Vlasov Group of Monaco and the Lefebvre family of Rome, it pioneered all-inclusive cruising with its first ship, Silver Cloud. Since July 2020, it has been owned by Royal Caribbean Group.

== History ==
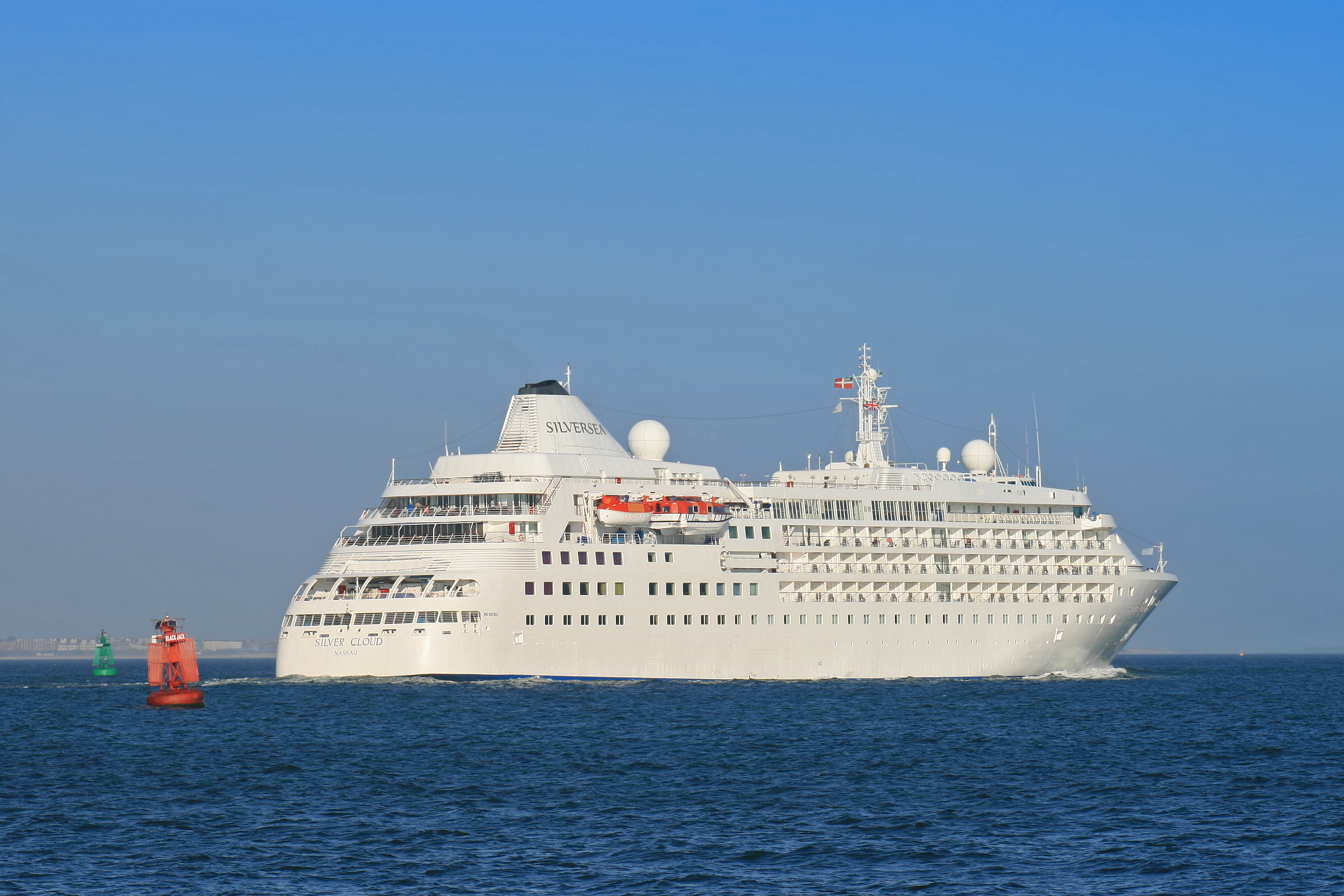
Silver Cloud, Silversea's first ship

=== Founding ===
Silversea was founded in 1994 by a joint venture between V-Ships (previously known as Vlasov Group) of Monaco and Antonio Lefebvre d'Ovidio of Rome. The joint owners had previously been the co-owners of Sitmar Cruises.

As a marketing strategy the new line introduced all-inclusive fares including gratuities, beverages, port charges, travel insurance, and some complimentary shore excursions. As about 80 percent of Silversea's customers were expected to come from North America, the line established a sales office in Fort Lauderdale, Florida. The first president of Silversea would be John Bland, former president of Sitmar Cruises. The majority of the first office staff had worked together at Sitmar Cruises.

Silversea's first ship, Silver Cloud, which entered service in April 1994, was followed in January 1995 by a sister ship, Silver Wind. In September 2000, the line launched Silver Shadow and Silver Whisper in January 2001. Both of these ships were enlarged versions of the original two ships, carrying about 100 more passengers.

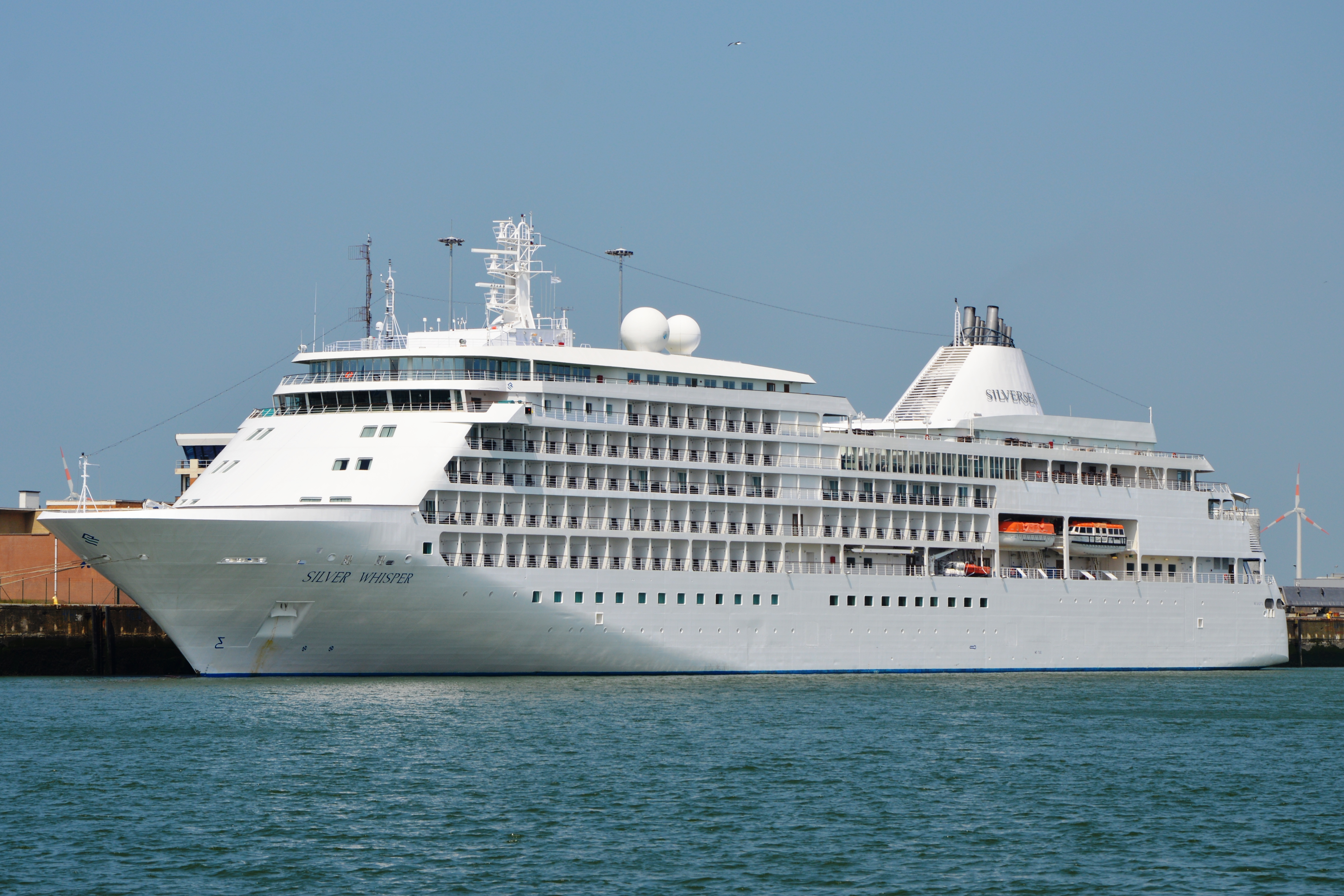
Silver Whisper, part of the second generation of new builds

In June 2001, Silversea announced that Manfredi Lefebvre d'Ovidio would become chairman of Silversea, assuming the position from his brother Francesco Lefebvre d’Ovidio.

=== Expedition division ===
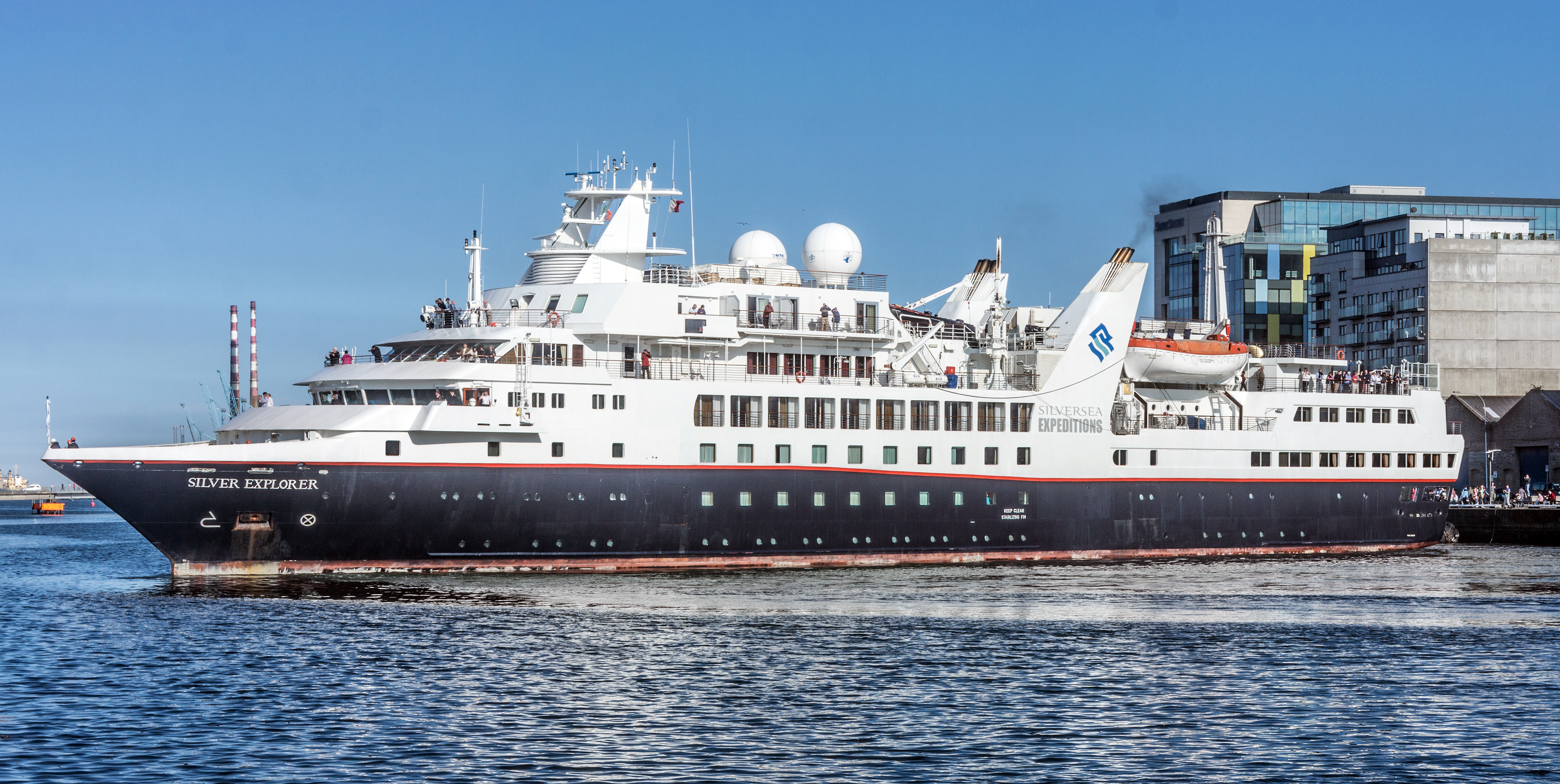
Silver Explorer, Silversea's first expedition ship

In 2007, Silversea announced they would be starting an expedition division with the acquisition of the 144 passenger former World Discoverer. Silversea hired expedition guide Conrad Combrink with a mandate to create a luxury expedition product, something that did not yet exist in the cruise industry. The purchased ship was renamed Prince Albert II (now Silver Explorer) and christened by Prince Albert II of Monaco.

In December 2009, Silversea launched Silver Spirit, the first in a new class of ships.

On 18 June 2012, Silversea acquired Canodros S.A., an Ecuadorian tourism company that operated in the Galápagos Islands. The purchase of the line also included the former Renaissance ship Galapagos Explorer II. She was subsequently moved into the "Silversea Expeditions" brand along with Silver Explorer. Silver Galapagos entered service in September 2013.

On 10 September 2013, Silversea confirmed that it would be adding a third vessel to the "Silversea Expeditions" brand, Silver Discoverer, formerly sailing as Clipper Odyssey for Zegrahm Expeditions. Silver Discoverer was christened in Singapore in March 2014 and set sail on her inaugural voyage along Australia's Kimberley Coast on 2 April 2014.

=== Trio of newbuilds ===
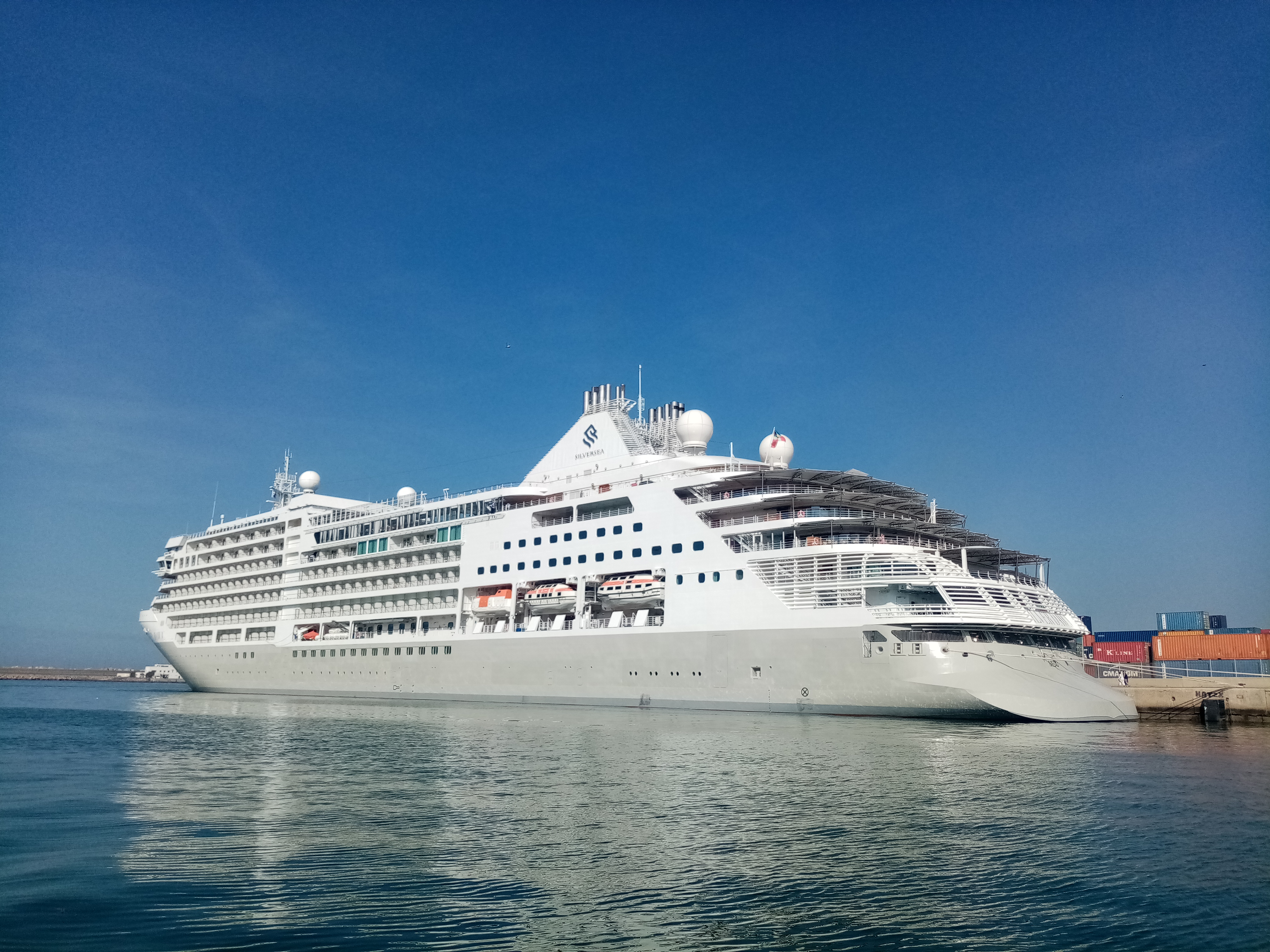
Silver Dawn, final ship of the Muse-class with new grey hull livery

Fincantieri delivered the fleet's ninth ship, Silver Muse to Silversea on 2 April 2017, at its Sestri Ponente shipyard. Silver Muse's debut cruise set sail on 10 April 2017, in the Mediterranean Sea. That same year, Silversea announced an order for Silver Moon, a sister ship to Silver Muse, to be built by Fincantieri and delivered in 2020. In May 2018, Silversea announced an order for Silver Dawn, another sister ship of Silver Muse, delivered by Fincantieri in 2021.

=== Acquired by Royal Caribbean ===
On 14 June 2018, Royal Caribbean purchased a majority stake in Silversea for approximately $1 billion from Manfredi Lefebvre d'Ovidio, son of cofounder Antonio Lefebvre d'Ovidio, and who had become the sole owner of the cruise line. The transaction was completed in July 2018. Following the announcement, Silversea ordered three new ships: two Evolution-class vessels to be built by Meyer Werft to be delivered beginning 2022 and one expedition vessel from Shipyard De Hoop to be delivered in March 2020.

In July 2020, Royal Caribbean Group acquired the remaining shares of Silversea from Heritage Cruise Holding in exchange for 5.2 million shares of Royal Caribbean Group stock. Silversea also took delivery of the new expedition ship the Silver Origin, built for their expedition fleet in the Galapagos Islands. This was the first new ship to be designed and completed under the new Royal Caribbean Group management.

On 14 June 2022, early reports came out that Silversea was very interested in purchasing Crystal Endeavor from the defunct Crystal Cruises brand, with records of the trademarked name Silver Endeavor being filled. However, it was further reported on 28 June, that both The Ritz-Carlton Yacht Collection and the former owners of Silversea, Heritage Cruise Holding (who recently purchased the two Crystal ships and the entire brand) were still interested in purchasing the vessel as well. Silversea's purchase was confirmed in July 2022, with a purchase price of $275 million, and the ship being renamed Silver Endeavor.

In December 2022, Barbara Muckerman replaced Roberto Martinoli as Silversea President and CEO.

=== Evolution class ===
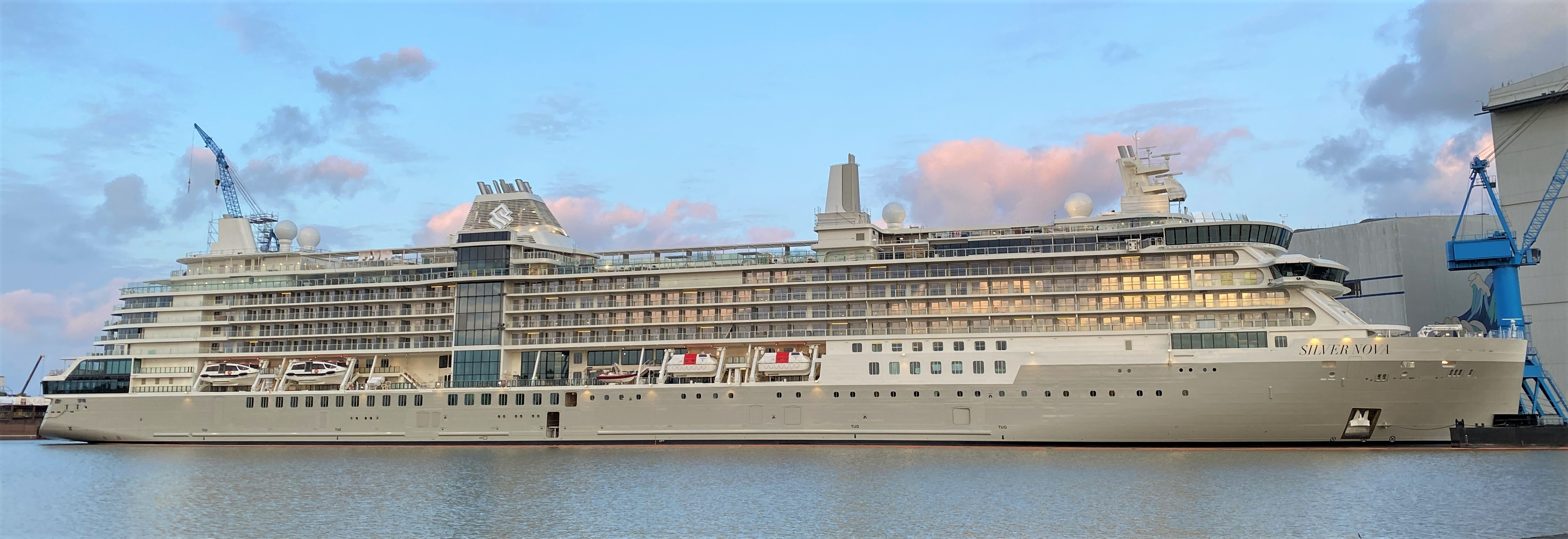
Silver Nova, part of the new next generation Evolution class

In July 2023, Silversea took delivery of their twelfth ship, Silver Nova, part of the new Evolution class of vessel, and innovative asymmetrical design, and the largest ship for the line. The ship was named on 4 January 2024, which also kicked off Silversea's 30th anniversary year. The second ship, Silver Ray, entered service in 2024.

On 12 April 2024, it was announced that Bert Herndez replaced Barbara Muckermann as president of Silversea Cruises.

On 14 May 2024, Silversea took delivery of the second Evolution-class ship, Silver Ray, in Eemshaven, Netherlands, two days earlier than planned, with a maiden voyage scheduled for 15 June from Lisbon, Portugal.

== Leadership ==
Silversea was solely owned and led by the Lefebvre d’Ovidio family until 2018, and fully bought out by Royal Caribbean Group in 2020. The cruise line has had 8 presidents in its 30-year history:

President	Years	Ships Introduced
John Bland	1992–1995	Silver Cloud, Silver Wind
Bill Smith	1995–2001	Silver Shadow, Silver Whisper
Albert Peter	2001–2007	Silver Explorer
Amerigo Perasso	2007–2010	Silver Spirit
Enzo Visone	2010–2016	Silver Discoverer, Silver Galapagos, Silver Muse
Roberto Martinoli	2016–2022	Silver Moon, Silver Dawn, Silver Origin
Barbara Muckermann	2022–2024	Silver Endeavour, Silver Nova
Bert Hernadez	2024–present	Silver Ray

== Fleet ==
=== Current fleet ===
The table lists the current fleet of ships operated by Silversea Cruises.

Ship	Built	Builder	In service for Silversea	Passengers	Gross tonnage	Flag	Christened by	Notes	Image
Silver Cloud	1994	Francisco Visentini (hull); T. Mariotti (completion)	1994–present	254	17,400	Bahamas	Eugenia Beck Lefebvre D'Ovidio (chairman's mother)	Transferred to expedition service in 2017	
Silver Wind	1995	Francisco Visentini (hull); T. Mariotti (completion)	1995– present	274	17,400	Bahamas	Patrizia Lefebvre D'Ovidio (founders daughter in law)	Transferred to expedition service in 2021	
Silver Shadow	2000	Francisco Visentini (hull); T. Mariotti (completion)	2000–present	392	28,258	Bahamas	Janet Burke (Silversea VP)		
Silver Whisper	2001	Francisco Visentini (hull); T. Mariotti (completion)	2001–present	392	28,258	Bahamas	Marzia Lefebvre D'Ovidio(chairmans wife)		
Silver Spirit	2009	Fincantieri, Italy	2009–present	608	39,519	Bahamas	Silvia Lefebvre D'Ovidio (chairmans sister)	Originally 36,000 tons. Lengthened in March 2018.	
Silver Muse	2017	Fincantieri, Italy	2017–present	596	40,791	Bahamas	Costanza Lefebvre d'Ovidio(chairmans daughter)		
Silver Moon	2020	Fincantieri, Italy	2020–present	596	40,844	Bahamas	Gaia Gaja(Italian winemaker)	Sister ship to Silver Muse keel laid on 15 February 2019	
Silver Origin	2020	Shipyard De Hoop, Netherlands	2020 –present	100	6,365	Ecuador	Johanna Carrión (Galápagos conservationist)	First purpose built expedition ship for Silversea	
Silver Dawn	2021	Fincantieri, Italy	2021–present	596	40,855	Bahamas	Nilou Motamed (Food & Travel writer/personality )	Sister ship to Silver Moon	
Silver Endeavour	2021	MV Werften Stralsund, Germany	2022–present	220	20,649	Bahamas	Felicity Aston (British adventurer/climate scientist)	Previously Crystal Endeavor	
Silver Nova	2023	Meyer Werft, Germany	2023–present	728	55,051	Bahamas	Nina Compton (Chef)	Largest ship built for Silversea	
Silver Ray	2024	Meyer Werft, Germany	2024–present	728	55,051	Bahamas	Maria Josefina Olascoaga (ocean scientist)	Sister ship to Silver Nova	

=== Former fleet ===
Ship	Built	Builder	In service for Silversea	Gross tonnage	Flag	Notes	
Silver Explorer	1989	Rauma-Repola	2008–2023	6,072	Bahamas	Left Silversea in November 2023 to join expedition cruise line Exploris	Silver Explorer
Silver Discoverer	1989	NKK Tsu Works - Tsu, Japan	2014–2019	5,218	Bahamas		
Silver Galapagos	1990	Cantieri Navale Ferrari-Signani	2013–2021	4,200	Ecuador	Former Resistance 3	

== See also ==
- Sitmar Cruises
- Oceania Cruises
- Regent Seven Seas Cruises
- Seabourn Cruise Line
