= Silver Cloud (ship) =

Monaco luxury cruise ship built in 1994

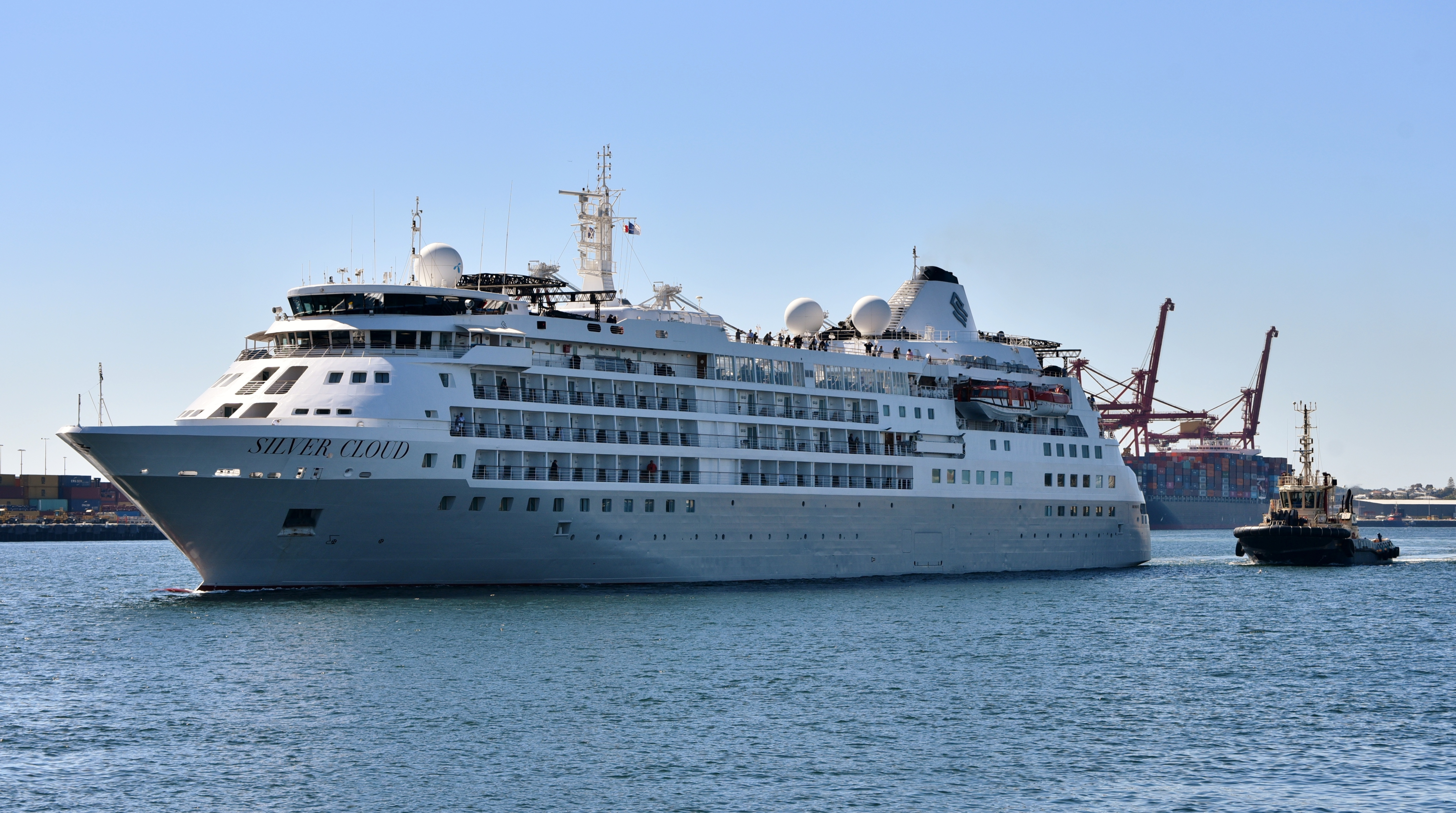
- Silver Cloud in grey hull expedition livery departing from Fremantle, Australia, at the start of Silversea's Grand South Pacific Expedition 2026

History
- Operator: Silversea Cruises
- Port of registry: Nassau, Bahamas
- Builder: Cantieri Navali Visentini (hull) T. Mariotti (completion)
- Yard number: 775
- Launched: 6 March 1993
- Christened: Eugenia Beck Lefebvre D'Ovidio (founders wife)
- Maiden voyage: 2 April 1994
- Identification: Call sign: C6MQ5; IMO number: 8903923; MMSI number: 309027000
- Status: In Service

General characteristics
- Type: Cruise ship
- Tonnage: 16,800 GT
- Length: 514 ft (157 m)
- Beam: 71 ft (22 m)
- Decks: 9 total, 6 for passengers
- Ice class: ice class rating of 1C
- Speed: 18 knots (33 km/h)
- Capacity: 296 passengers
- Crew: 222

Silver Cloud is a small luxury cruise ship operated by Silversea Cruises. She is Silversea's first ship and entered service in 1994. Her sister ship is the Silver Wind, launched in 1995.

Silver Cloud currently sails on luxury expedition focused cruises for Silversea.

== History ==
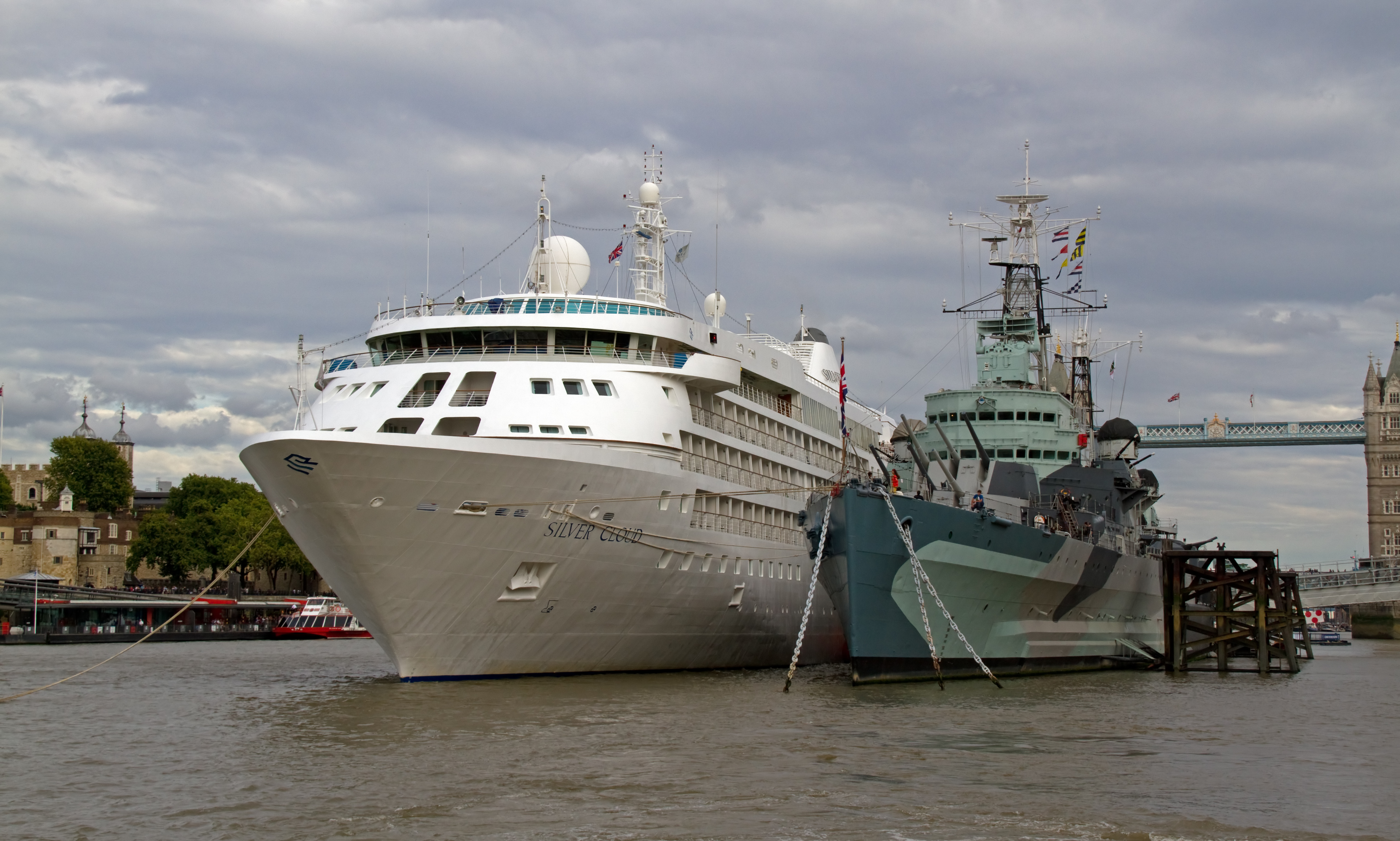
Silver Cloud in original livery moored with HMS Belfast at Tower Bridge in 2011

Initial planning for Silver Cloud and her sister began in 1991 between Antonio Lefebvre d'Ovidio and V Ships, who had been in a partnership together for Sitmar Cruises.

They hired ship designer Petter Yran from Yran & Storbraaten. The ships were intended to be luxurious, with 75% of the staterooms to have verandahs - at that time, something unheard of in the cruise industry.

The Silver Cloud's hull was constructed at Cantiere Navale Visentini Shipyard near Venice, Italy, and then towed to T. Mariotti for completion of the rest of the ship. The name Silver Cloud, named after the famed Rolls Royce, was chosen by the cruise line's Chairman and former owner, Manfredi Lefebvre D’Ovidio, to signal to guests that they could expect top-class service.

The ships's christening ceremony was in Monte Carlo on March 30, 1994. Prince Albert of Monaco attended, and the ship was named after the wife of one of Silversea's co-founders, Eugenia Beck Lefebvre D'Ovidio.

The Silver Cloud was home to both the United States men's and women's national basketball teams during the 2016 Summer Olympics in Rio de Janeiro, Brazil.

Silver Cloud formerly sailed on European itineraries (both the North Sea and the Mediterranean) in summer. In winter, she cruised in the Caribbean and South America.

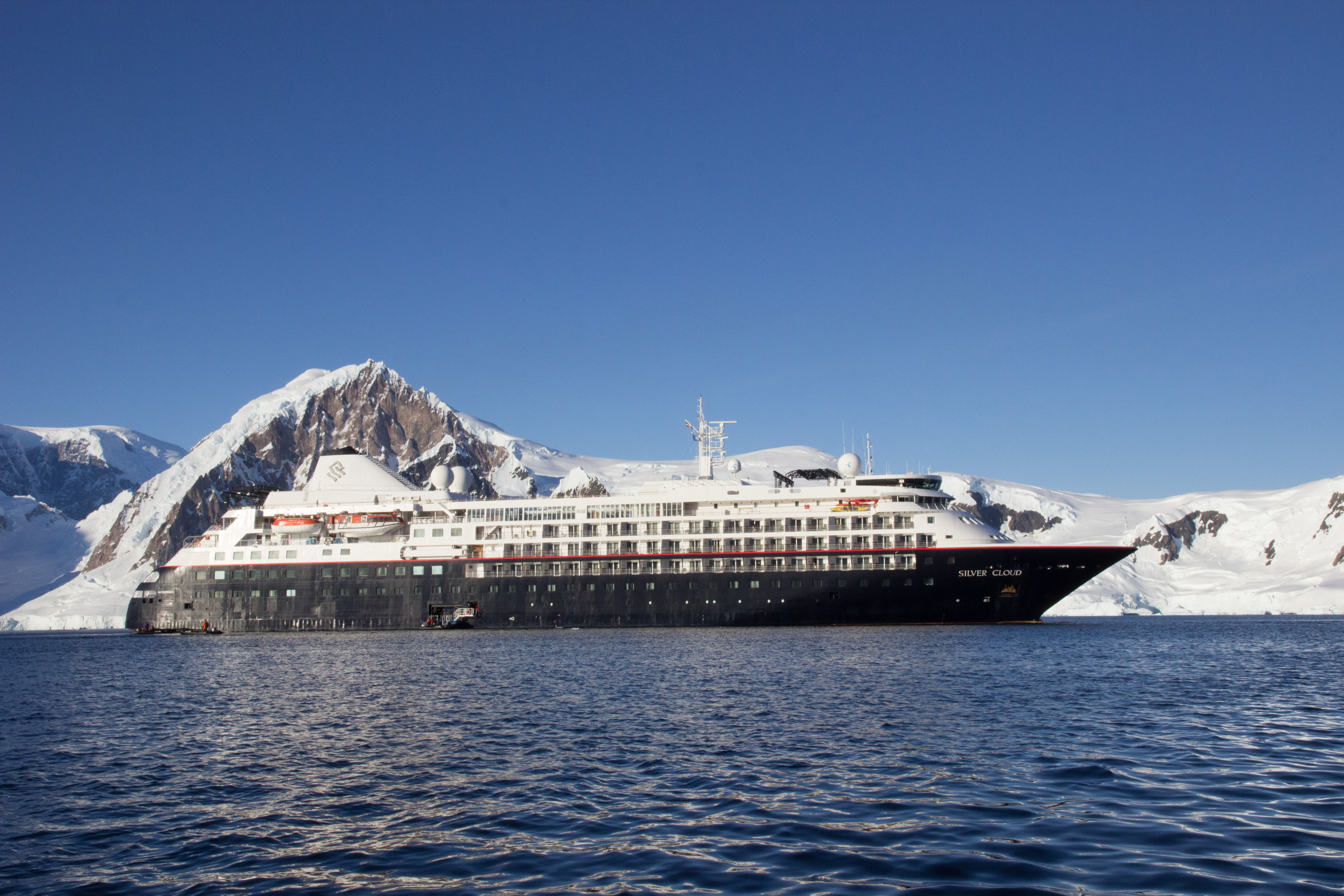
Silver Cloud in initial dark blue hull expedition livery in Paradise Harbour, Antarctica, in 2019

In 2017, the ship underwent a comprehensive rebuild to bring her up to ice class, with the addition of a fleet of zodiacs added to the top decks. The interiors also received a refit, with a reconfigured observation lounge and refurbished public spaces. The hull was repainted a dark blue to distinguish it as part of the expedition fleet. This livery was later changed to match the grey hull of the rest of the Silversea fleet. The ship primarily sails on expedition cruises, including in polar regions.

During an expedition cruise along the Kimberley coast in June 2024, a group of around 100 Silver Cloud passengers and crew on an inflatable boat tour became stranded at low tide near Adele Island. Most of the passengers waded 500 m (1,600 ft) through shallow water over a coral reef to deeper water where they were collected. The remaining stranded passengers stayed in the zodiacs and waited for hours in darkness before the tide came in and they were able to return to the ship. The Kimberley region has the highest tidal range in the Southern Hemisphere.
