= Silver Endeavour =

Megayacht operated by Silversea Cruises

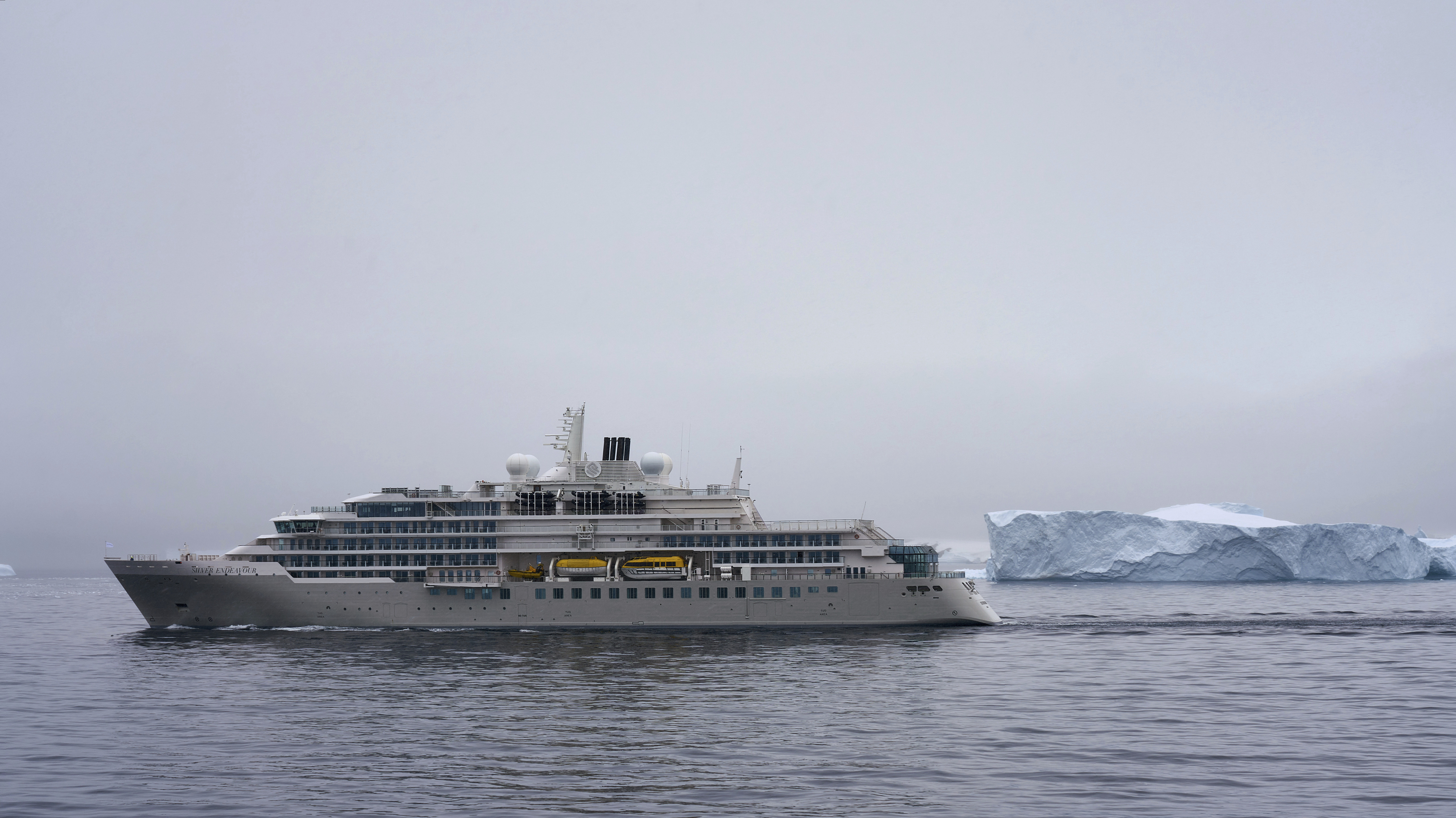
- Silver Endeavour in Gerlache Strait - Antarctica

History

Bahamas
- Name: 2021–2022: Crystal Endeavor; 2022: Silver Endeavour
- Namesake: HMS Endeavour
- Operator: 2021–2022: Crystal Cruises; 2022: Silversea Cruises
- Port of registry: 2021–present: Nassau, Bahamas
- Ordered: August 19, 2016
- Builder: MV Werften
- Cost: € 350 million
- Laid down: February 9, 2018
- Launched: December 22, 2019
- Christened: June 26, 2021 by Manuela Schwesig
- Completed: June 29, 2021
- Maiden voyage: July 17, 2021
- Identification: Call sign: C6DX3; IMO number: 9821873; MMSI number: 311000932

General characteristics
- Type: Cruiseship
- Tonnage: 20,449 GT
- Length: 164.5 m
- Decks: 10 decks
- Ice class: Polar Class 6
- Installed power: 4 × Wärtsilä 6L32E/E2 (4 × 13,020 kW kW)
- Propulsion: Diesel-electric; two ABB Azipod D propulsion units
- Speed: 20 knots (37 km/h; 23 mph)
- Capacity: 200 passengers
- Crew: 209 crew

Silver Endeavour (formerly Crystal Endeavor) is a cruise ship operated by Silversea Cruises. Originally built for Crystal Cruises by MV Werften in Stralsund, Germany, she was laid down in 2018 and completed in June 2021. She is the world's largest ice class expedition yacht, bearing a Polar Class rating of PC6.

== Concept and construction ==
Following the success of Crystal Esprit, the Crystal Cruises built the world's first purpose-built Polar Class megayacht for the luxury cruise market. Her namesake is HMS Endeavour, Captain James Cooks' research ship, which discovered Australia and New Zealand; and the new vessel was designed for global expeditions in the Arctic and Antarctic as well as in tropical conditions. The ship included first-of-its-kind features for a cruise line including a U-Boat Worx Cruise Sub 7–300, and a remote-operated vehicle with an underwater camera to feed images back to screens in suites. While also being the world's largest ice-class cruiseship gaining a PC6 rating.

On June 26, 2021, she was christened at MV Werften shipyard, by Manuela Schwesig prime minister of Mecklenburg-Vorpommern.

== Crystal Cruises ==
The ship's maiden voyage began July 17, 2021, with a 10-night circumnavigation of Iceland.

Crystal Endeavor's focus was on Arctic voyages to Iceland, calling at Westfjords in Patreksfjörður, the Arctic Circle on Grímsey Island, and Zodiac cruising in Djúpivogur, along with Antarctic voyages within the Antarctic Peninsula. During her first year she also visited the Faroe Islands as well as the Orkney and Shetland Islands and Fair Isle in Scotland; then a Caribbean season before heading for Antarctica.

Following the collapse of parent company Genting Hong Kong in January 2022, Crystal Endeavor completed her last Antarctic cruise in February, at Ushuaia, Argentina and was then laid up at Montevideo, Uruguay under arrest. In March she was moved to Gibraltar for judicial auction.

On June 14, 2022, it was first announced that Crystal Endeavor had been apparently sold to Silversea Cruises. In the weeks prior, Silversea had trademarked the names "Silver Endeavor" and "Silver Endeavour". However, it was further reported on June 28, that both The Ritz-Carlton Yacht Collection and the former owners of Silversea, Heritage Cruise Holding (which recently purchased Crystal's two ocean-going cruise ships and the entire brand) were still interested in purchasing the vessel as well, with the former submitting the highest bid. Royal Caribbean had yet to confirm or deny if they had made the purchase at that time.

== Silversea Cruises ==
On Monday July 18, 2022, Royal Caribbean Group announced they received court approval to buy the "ultra-luxury" expedition cruiseship Crystal Endeavor for $275 million. The company said the purchase was being made "significantly below" the cost of construction, with the purchase fully financed through a 15-year term loan. The megayacht would be renamed Silver Endeavour when it officially joined the fleet of Royal Caribbean's Silversea Cruises. Prior to her maiden voyage it was intended to refit the ship, but due to scheduling and supply chain issues, only minor modifications were made with venue names and signage. Following the Antarctic season several substantial changes were made to the Silver Endeavour including: converting the casino into crew cabins and an infirmary, removing the current infirmary and converting into four balcony suites, and removing the helicopter bay on Deck 8, and remodeling it into six suites, since Silversea has no plans to utilize the two helicopters that Crystal had on order for the ship.

The Silver Endeavour was christened in Antarctica on November 19, 2022, by godmother Felicity Aston MBE, a polar explorer and climate scientist. This was the first ship ever to be named in the Lemaire Channel, with an ice-sculpted magnum bottle smashed against the hull. The maiden voyage under Silversea was scheduled for November 28, 2022.
