= Silver Muse =

Cruise ship owned by Silversea Cruises

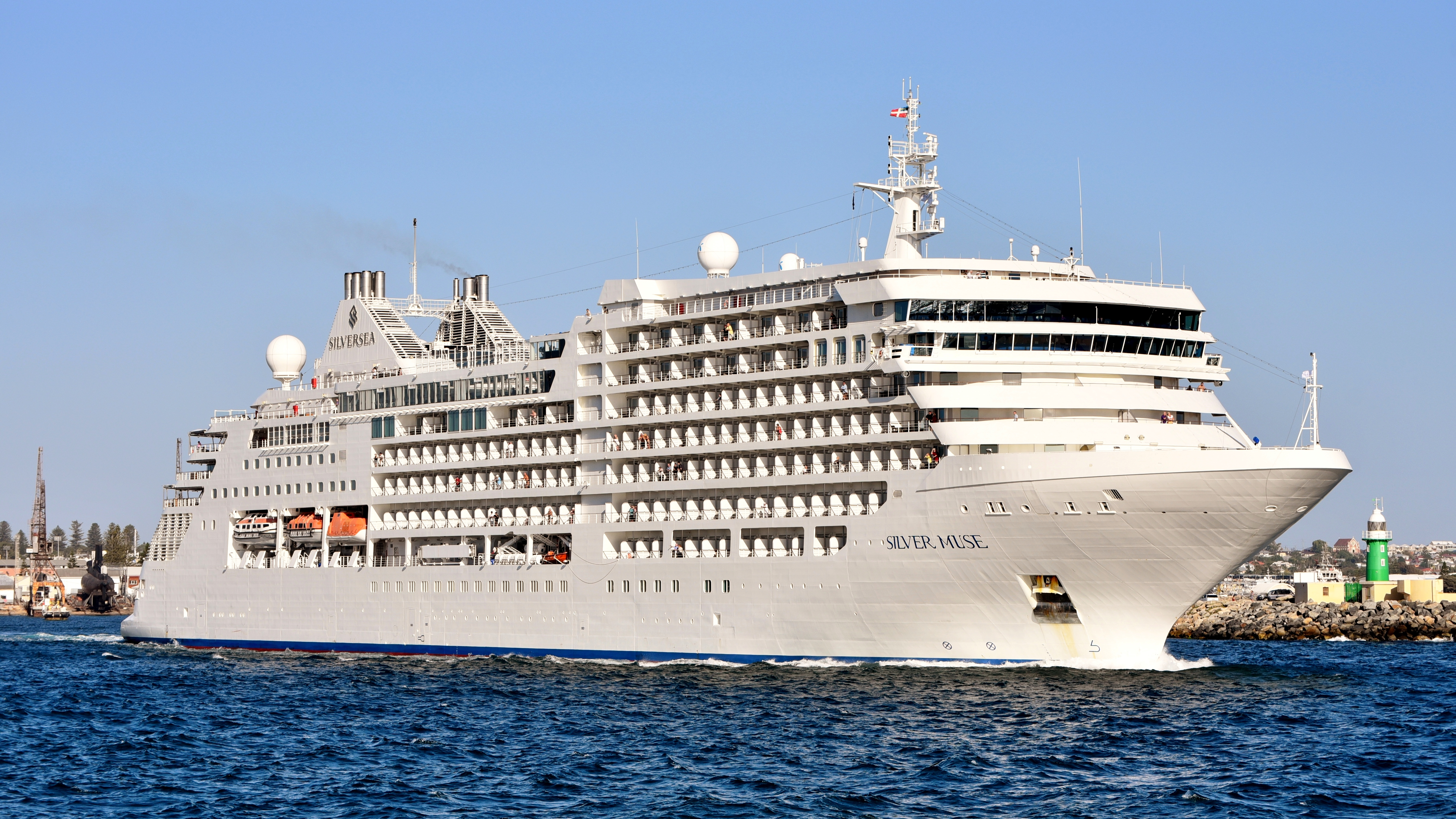
- Silver Muse leaving Fremantle in March 2019

History

Bahamas
- Name: Silver Muse
- Owner: Silversea Cruises
- Operator: Silversea Cruises
- Port of registry: Nassau, Bahamas
- Builder: Fincantieri
- Yard number: 6226
- In service: April 2017
- Identification: IMO number: 9784350; MMSI number: 311000637; Callsign: C6DC5
- Status: In Service

General characteristics
- Type: Cruise ship
- Tonnage: 40,791 GT
- Length: 212.8 meters
- Beam: 27 meters
- Draught: 6.55 meters
- Speed: 19.8 knots cruising, about 21 knots maximum
- Capacity: 596 passengers
- Crew: 411

Silver Muse is a cruise ship owned by Silversea Cruises. It was constructed by Fincantieri in Genoa and joined the company's fleet in April 2017. It is the lead ship of Silversea's Muse-class, and was followed by her sister ships Silver Moon (2020) and Silver Dawn (2021).

== Design ==
Silver Muse has a tonnage of 40,791 GT. The ship can accommodate 596 guests in 298 cabins and 411 crew members in 262 cabins. Silver Muse has eight dining areas.

=== Machinery ===
The ship is powered by four diesel 6.525 MW engines each of which drives a 6.3 MW 60 Hz 6.6 kV 3-phase generator. The electricity from the generators power two VEM AC Electric 8.5 MW double winding synchronous motors each of which powers a fixed-pitch propeller. The ship also has a 900 kW 60 Hz 440 V 3phase emergency generator.

== Construction ==
The contract for the delivery of the ship was signed in 2014 with Fincantieri S.p.A. with the first steel being cut in July 2015. Following her delivery by the shipbuilder she was named on 17 April 2017 at Port Hercules in Monaco by Costanza Lefebvre d'Ovidio, the daughter of the chairman of Silversea Cruises.

== Service ==
After departing Fincantieri's yard, the ship commenced an eight-day Easter voyage in April 2017 that started and ended at Monaco visiting Porto Mahon, Livorno and Portofino. Two days later, it commenced its official 13 day maiden voyage from Monaco to Nice between April and May 2017, stopping at ports in Barcelona, Valletta, Amalfi and Sorrento.

The cruise ship then commenced a series of voyages in Europe, Canada, North and South America, as well as the Caribbean, covering 130 destinations in 34 countries.

A substantial refurbishment was planned to take place in 2025.
