= Silver Wind =

Cruise ship

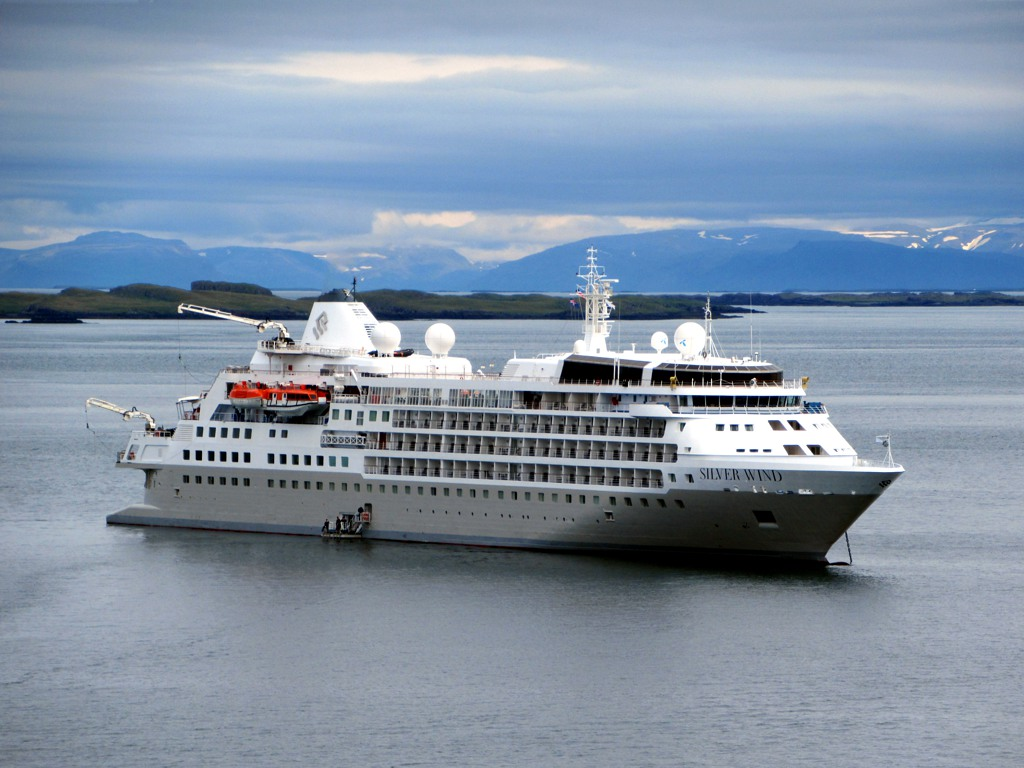
- Silver Wind at anchor off Stykkisholmur, Iceland.

History
- Name: Silver Wind
- Owner: Silversea Cruises
- Operator: Silversea Cruises
- Port of registry: Nassau, Bahamas
- Ordered: 1994
- Builder: Visentini Shipyard
- Yard number: 776
- Laid down: 1995
- Launched: 16 October 1995
- Completed: 1995
- Maiden voyage: 1995
- Identification: Call sign C6FG2; IMO number: 8903935; MMSI number: 308814000
- Status: In service

General characteristics
- Type: Cruise ship
- Tonnage: 16,800 GT
- Length: 156 metres long
- Beam: 21 metres wide
- Draft: 4.5 metres draft
- Decks: 7
- Speed: 21.9 knots
- Capacity: 294 passengers
- Crew: 208

Silver Wind is a small cruise ship operated by Silversea Cruises, a luxury cruise line. The ship entered service in 1995 and is the second ship of her class, the first being her sister ship Silver Cloud, in service since 1994. She can accommodate 296 guests.
