= Cruise industry =

Organisations involved in ocean or river cruises

Cruise passenger count has increased about 7-fold since 1990, interrupted by the Covid-19 pandemic.

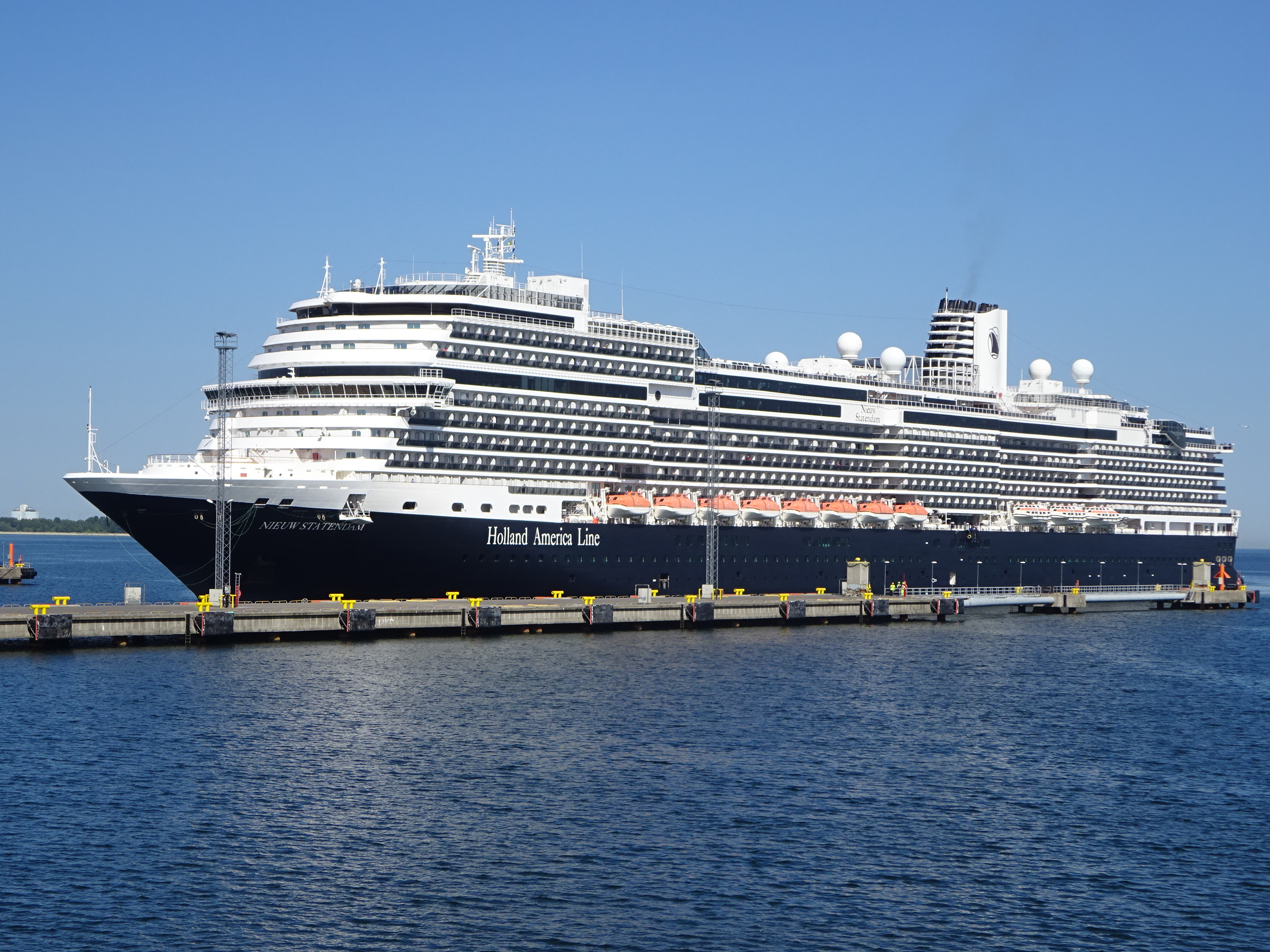
MS Nieuw Statendam, a cruise ship owned by Holland America Line

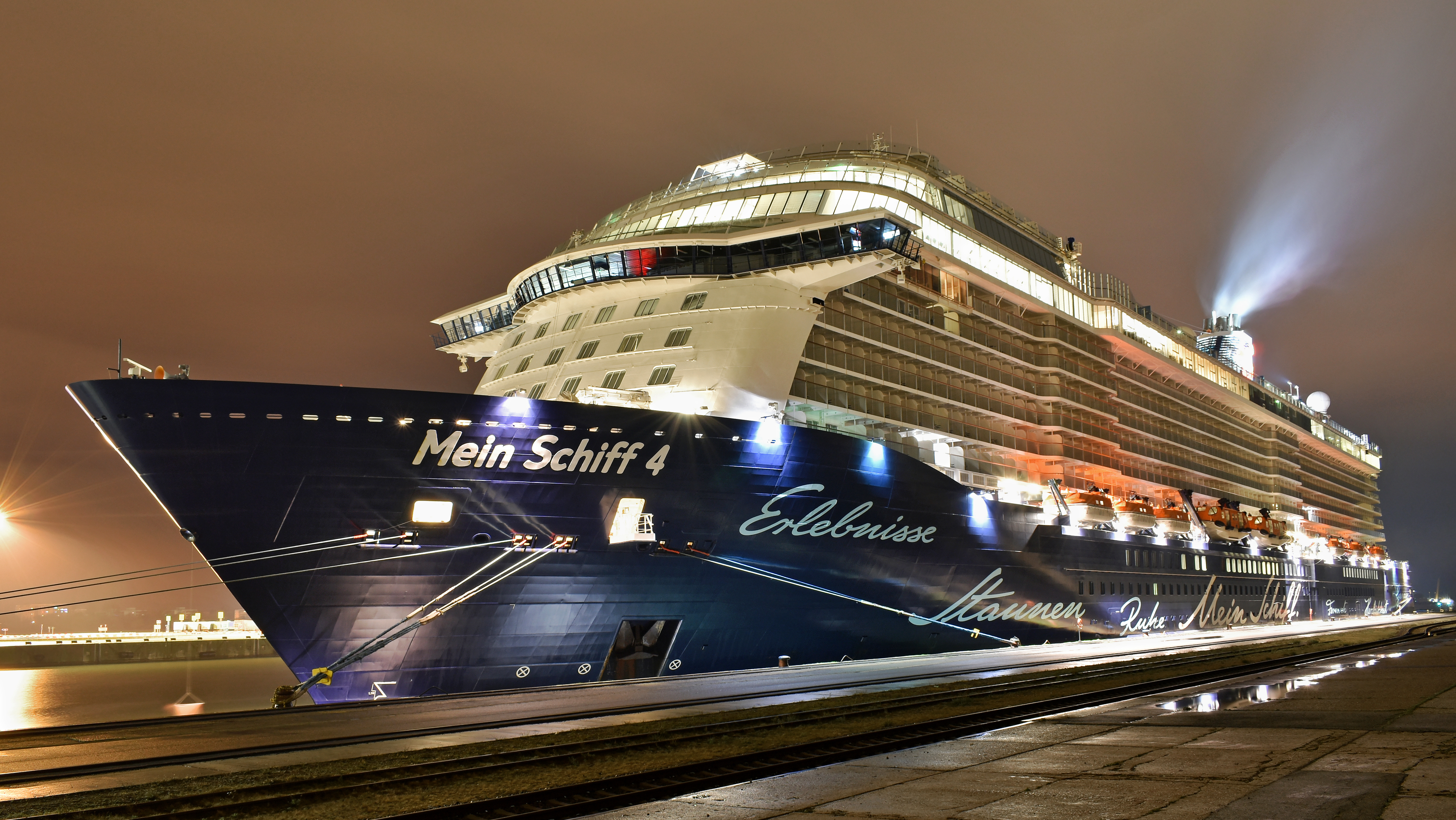
Mein Schiff 4, a cruise ship owned by TUI Cruises

The cruise industry consists of all businesses involved in leisure travel for the public on cruise ships or river boats. These include cruise lines, ports, recruitment agencies, resorts, shipbuilders, tour operators and travel agents. It is part of the larger tourist industry.

== Cruise lines ==
Cruise lines are a form of passenger line with a greater focus on leisure, hospitality and entertainment. Ships have both a regular crew headed by a ship's captain, and a hospitality staff headed by the equivalent of a hotel manager. Packages provided by cruise lines vary but all include accommodation, meals and entertainment. Extra fees may be charged for alcohol, fine dining, spa treatments and shore excursions.

Among cruise lines, some are direct descendants of the traditional passenger lines (such as Cunard), while others were founded since the 1960s specifically for cruising.

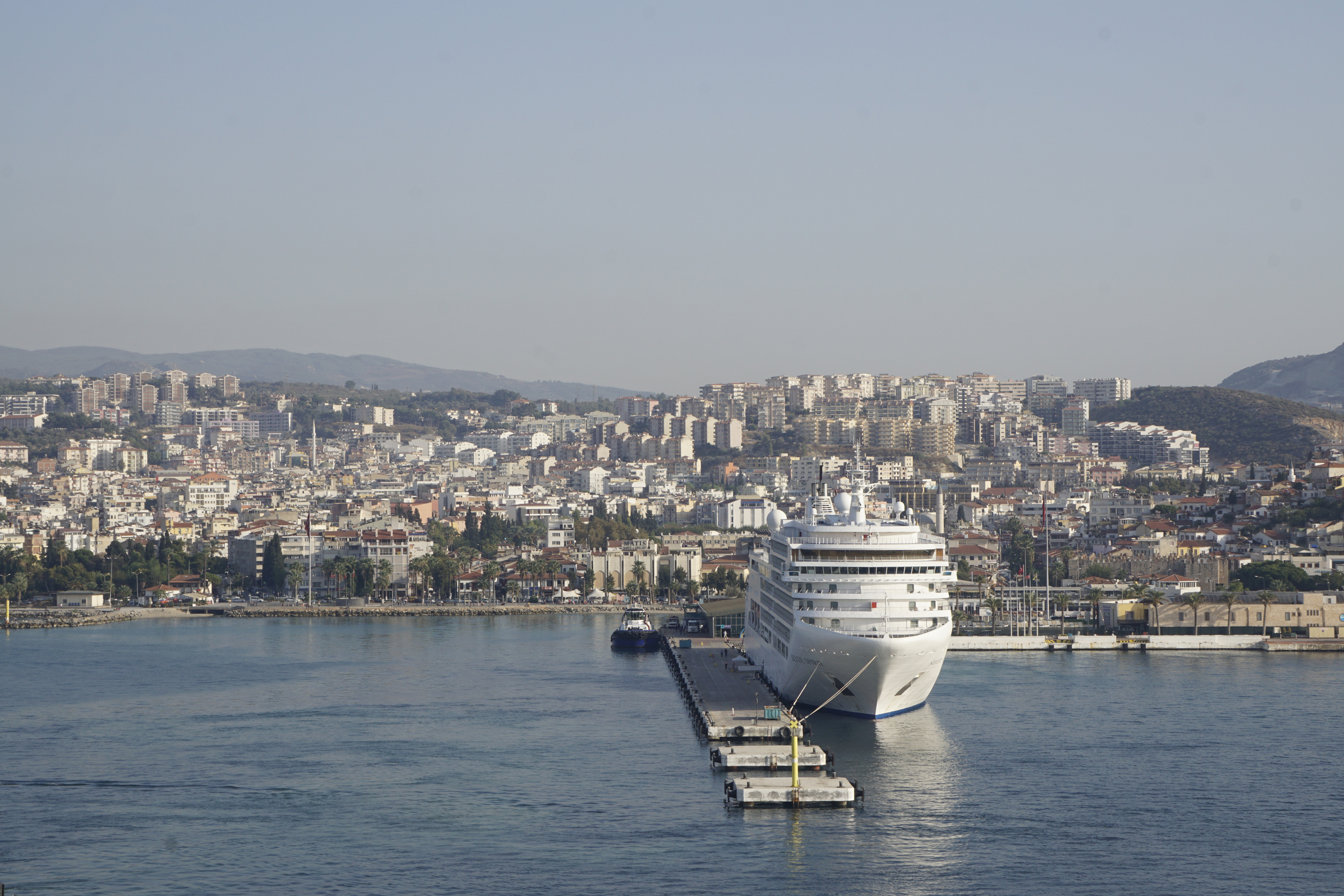
Silver Spirit in Kuşadası, Turkey

The business is extremely volatile. The ships are massive capital expenditures with very high operating costs, and a slight dip in bookings can easily put a company out of business. Cruise lines frequently sell, renovate or rename their ships to keep up with travel trends. Ships are operated continually and unscheduled maintenance can result in thousands of dissatisfied customers.

A common practice in the cruise industry in listing cruise ship transfers and orders is to list the smaller operating company, not the larger holding corporation, as the recipient cruise line of the sale, transfer, or new order. For example, Carnival Cruise Line and Holland America Line are cruise lines whereas Carnival Corporation & plc and Royal Caribbean Group are considered holding corporations. This industry practice of referring to cruise lines by brand rather than holding corporation is also followed by much of the public, for instance in online reviews.

Some cruise lines have specialties. For example, Saga Cruises only allows passengers over 50 years old aboard their ships, and Star Clippers and formerly Windjammer Barefoot Cruises and Windstar Cruises only operate tall ships. Regent Seven Seas Cruises operates medium-sized vessels—smaller than the "megaships" of Carnival and Royal Caribbean—designed such that virtually all of their suites are balconies. Several specialty lines offer "expedition cruising" or only operate small ships, visiting certain destinations such as the Arctic and Antarctica, or the Galápagos Islands. Short cruises with a focus on history are offered by some museum ships such as the John W. Brown.

== History ==
In the 1990s, a wave of failures and consolidations led to many cruise lines being bought by much larger holding companies and to operate as "brands" or subsidiaries of the holding company. Brands continue to be maintained partly because of the expectation of repeat customer loyalty, and also to offer different levels of quality and service. For instance, Carnival Corporation & plc owns both Carnival Cruise Line, whose former image were vessels that had a reputation as "party ships" for younger travellers, but have become large, modern, yet still profitable, and Holland America Line, whose ships cultivate an image of classic elegance.

In 2004, Carnival merged Cunard's headquarters with that of Princess Cruises in Santa Clarita, California so that administrative, financial and technology services could be combined, ending Cunard's history where it had operated as a standalone company (subsidiary) regardless of parent ownership. However, Cunard did regain some independence in 2009 when its headquarters were moved to Carnival House in Southampton.

In 2019, the total number of cabins on all of the world's cruise ships amounted to less than 2% of the world's hotel rooms.

Currently the three largest cruise line holding companies and operators in the world are Carnival Corporation & plc, Royal Caribbean Group and Norwegian Cruise Line Holdings.

== Regional industries ==
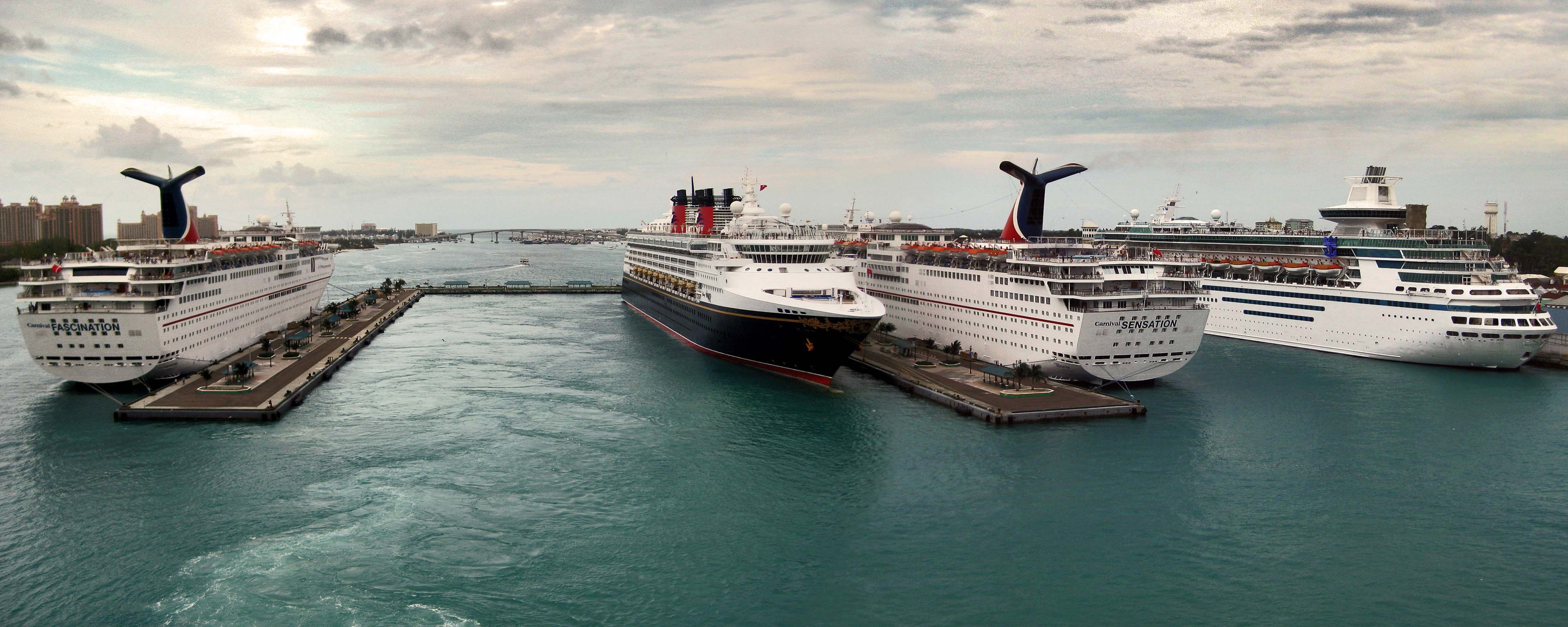
Four cruise ships docked at port of Nassau, the Bahamas

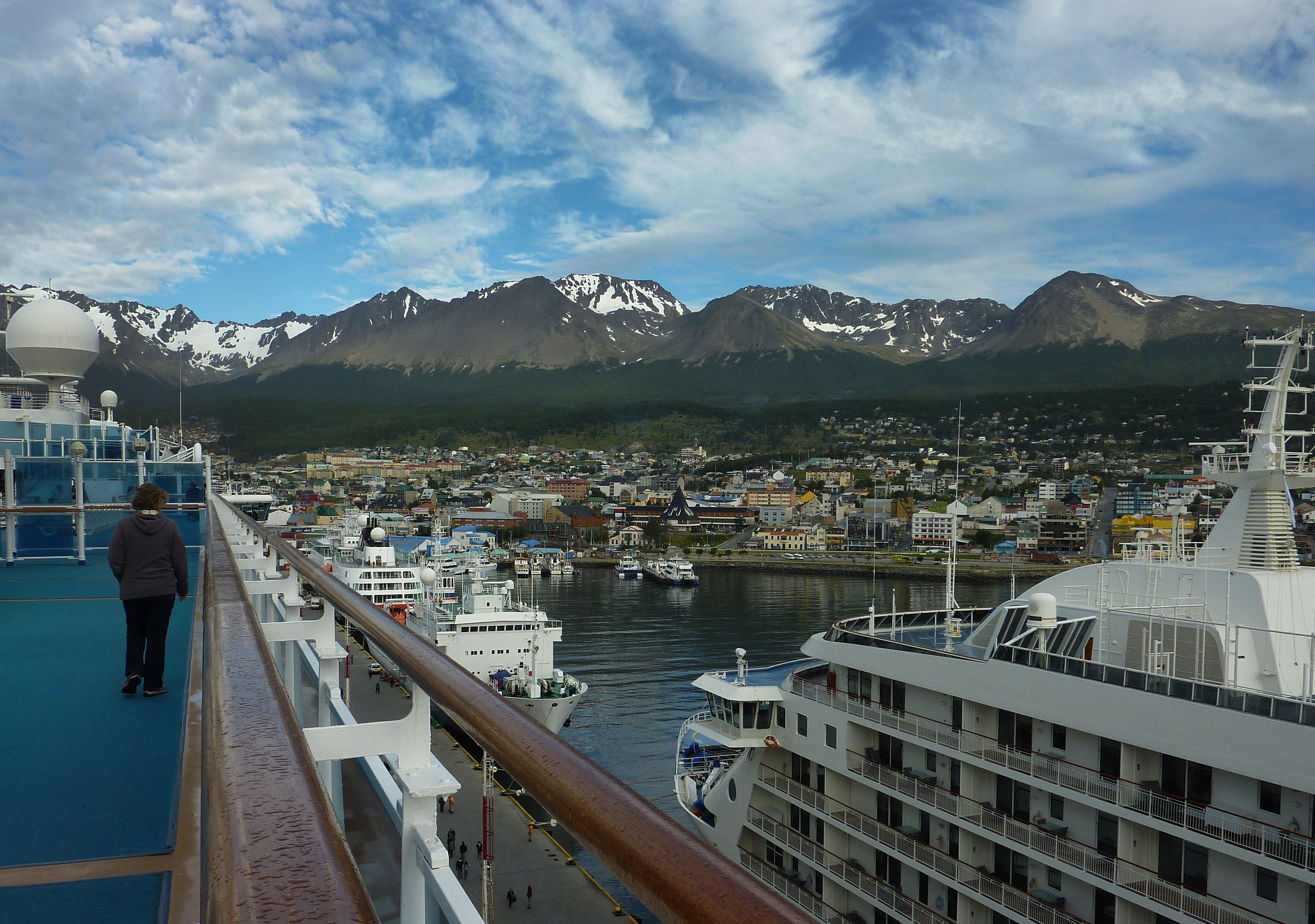
Cruise ships in Ushuaia, Argentina

Most cruise ships sail in the Caribbean or the Mediterranean. Others operate elsewhere in places like Alaska, the South Pacific, the Baltic Sea and New England. A cruise ship that is moving from one of these regions to another will commonly operate a repositioning cruise while doing so.

The number of cruise tourists worldwide in 2005 was estimated at 14 million. By 2024 this had increased to 34.5 million.

The second most popular region was continental Europe (13%), where the fastest growing segment is cruises in the Baltic Sea. The most visited Baltic ports are Copenhagen, St. Petersburg, Tallinn, Stockholm and Helsinki. The seaport of St. Petersburg, the main Baltic port of call, received 426,500 passengers during the 2009 cruise season.

According to 2010 CEMAR statistics the Mediterranean cruise market is going through a fast and fundamental change; Italy has won prime position as a destination for European cruises, and destination for the whole of the Mediterranean basin. The most visited ports in Mediterranean Sea are Barcelona (Spain), Civitavecchia (Italy), Palma (Spain) and Venice (Italy).

The first Chinese cruise company entered service in 2013. China's first luxury cruise ship, Henna, made her maiden voyage from Sanya Phoenix Island International Port in late January of that year.

=== Caribbean cruising industry ===
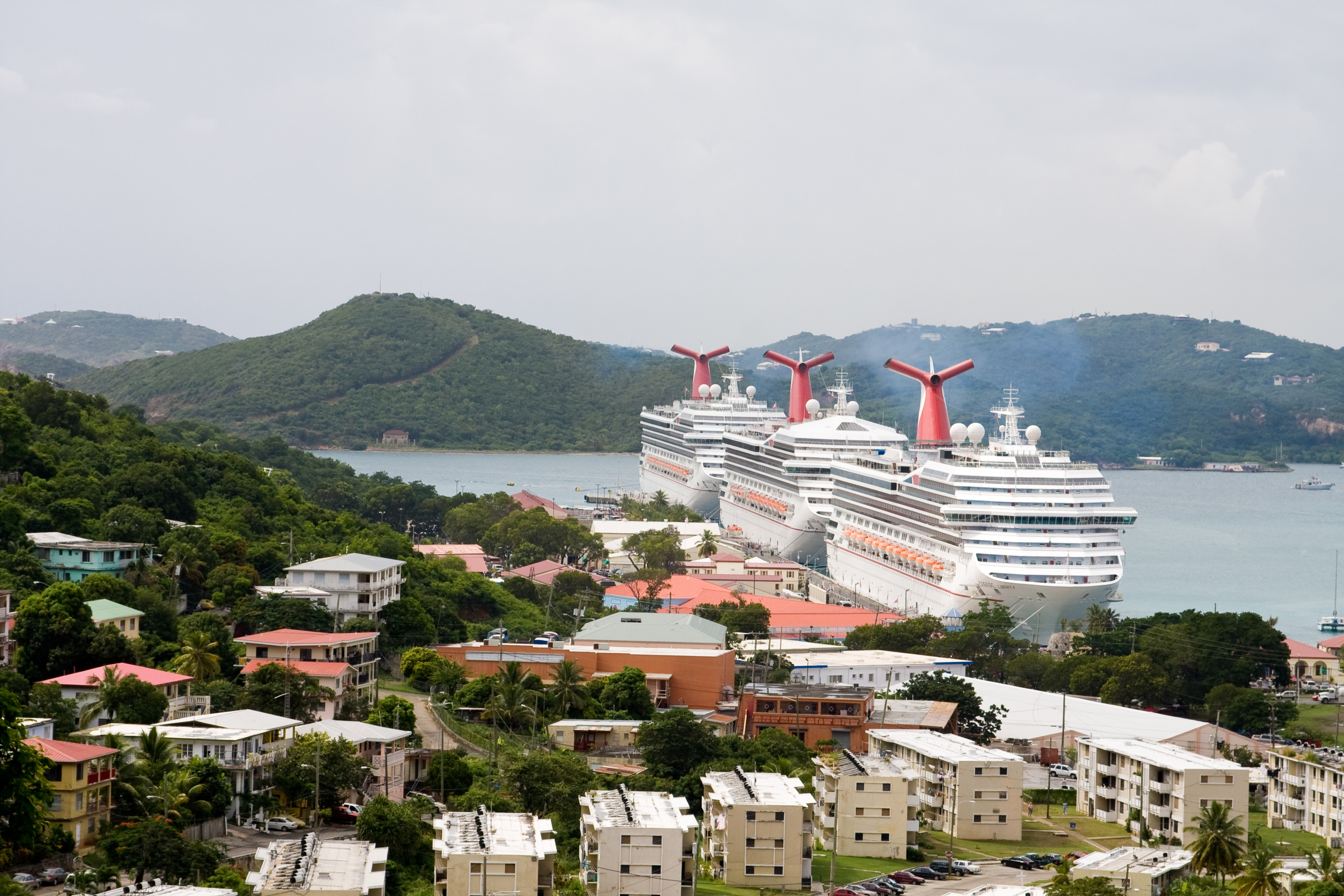
Nearly 9,000 passengers from three Carnival ships visiting St. Thomas, US Virgin Islands; from front to back: Carnival Liberty, Carnival Triumph and the Carnival Glory

The Caribbean cruising industry is one of the largest in the world, responsible for over $2 billion in direct revenue to the Caribbean islands in 2012. Over 45,000 people from the Caribbean are directly employed in the cruise industry. An estimated 17,457,600 cruise passengers visited the islands in the 2011–2012 cruise year (May 2011 to April 2012.) Cruise lines operating in the Caribbean include Royal Caribbean International, Princess Cruises, Carnival Cruise Line, Celebrity Cruises, Disney Cruise Line, Holland America, P&O, Cunard and Norwegian Cruise Line. There are also smaller cruise lines that cater to a more intimate feeling among their guests. The three largest cruise operators are Carnival Corporation, Royal Caribbean International, and Star Cruises/Norwegian Cruise Lines.

Many American cruise lines to the Caribbean depart out of the Port of Miami, with "nearly one-third of the cruises sailing out of Miami in recent years". Other cruise ships depart from Port Everglades (in Fort Lauderdale), Port Canaveral (approximately 45 miles (72 km) east of Orlando), New York, Tampa, Galveston, New Orleans, Cape Liberty, Baltimore, Jacksonville, Charleston, Norfolk, Mobile, and San Juan, Puerto Rico. Some UK cruise lines base their ships out of Barbados for the Caribbean season, operating direct charter flights out of the UK.

The busiest ports of call in the Caribbean for cruising in the 2014 year are listed below:

Rank	Destination	Passenger Arrivals (2014)
1	The Bahamas	4,804,701
2	Cozumel, Mexico	3,404,858
3	United States Virgin Islands	2,083,890
4	Sint Maarten	2,001,996
5	Cayman Islands	1,609,555
6	Jamaica	1,423,797
7	Puerto Rico	1,356,822
8	Turks and Caicos Islands	971,838
9	Belize	968,131
10	Aruba	667,095
11	Haiti	662,403
12	Saint Lucia	641,452
13	Curacao	629,145
14	Barbados	557,898
15	Antigua and Barbuda	522,342
16	Dominican Republic	435,494
17	Saint Kitts and Nevis	434,106
18	British Virgin Islands	378,083
19	Bermuda	356,093
20	Dominica	286,573
21	Grenada	235,140
22	Martinique	177,786
23	Saint Vincent and the Grenadines	85,170
24	Trinidad and Tobago	42,820

=== Alaskan cruising industry ===
2016 was the most recent year of CLIA (Cruise Lines International Association) studies conducted around the cruise industry specifically in the US and more specifically Alaska. In 2016, Alaskan cruises generated nearly 5 million passenger and crew visits, 20.3% of all passenger and crew visits in the US. (NASDAQ, 2017) Cruise lines frequently bring passengers to Glacier Bay National Park, Ketchikan, Anchorage, Skagway, and the state's capital, Juneau.

Alaska cruise statistics
	Total	Share of the U.S. (%)
Passenger embarkations	157,000	1.3
Resident cruise passengers	9,000	0.1
Total passenger & crew visits	4,897,000	20.3
Direct expenditures	$1,065m	4.9
Total employment impact	19,842	5.1
Total wage impact	$991m	4.8

Visitor volume is represented by overall visitors entering Alaskan waters and/or airspace. Between October 2016 and September 2017 Alaska had about 2.2 million visitors; 49% of those were through the cruise industry. That 2.2 million was a 27% increase since 2009, and the volume overall has steadily increased. Visitors generally spend money when travelling, and this is measured in two distinct areas: the cruising companies themselves and the visitors. There are no current numbers for cruise specific passenger spending ashore, but the overall visitor expenditure can be measured. Tours accounted for $394 million (18%), gifts and souvenirs $427 million (20%), food $428 million (20%), transportation $258 million (12%), lodging $454 million (21%), and other $217 million (10%). The second main area of economic growth comes from what the cruising companies and their crews spend themselves. Cruise liners spend around $297 million on the items that come in their packages on board and ashore as parts of group tours: things like stagecoach rides and boat tours on smaller vessels throughout their ports of call. This money is paid to the service providers by the cruise line company. Cruise liner crew are also a revenue generator, with 27,000 crew members visiting Alaska in 2017 alone, generating about $22 million. 2017 was also a good year for job generation within Alaska: 43,300 jobs were created, bringing in $1.5 billion in labor costs, and a total income of $4.5 billion was generated. These jobs were scattered across all of Alaska. Southeast Alaska had 11,925 jobs ($455 million labor income), Southwest 1,800 jobs ($50 million labor income), South Central 20,700 jobs ($761 million Labor income), Interior 8,500 jobs ($276 million labor income), Far North 375 jobs ($13 M labor income). Labor income is shown in the graph below.

	Employment	Labor Income US$ millions
Food and drink	6,900	173
Accommodations	6,200	163
Retail	5,300	108
Tours and activities	5,000	173
Transportation	4,100	173
Other	2,800	79
Total direct jobs/income from visitor spending	30,400	870
Direct Jobs / income from industry spending	4,100	133
Indirect / induced jobs income	8,800	536
Total visitor industry-related jobs / income	43,300	1,539

== Overtourism ==
Large cruise ships have been identified as one of the major causes of overtourism in places like Venice, Barcelona, and Dubrovnik.

Critics of the industry say it overwhelms the cities' infrastructure, causing overcrowding, damaging heritage sites, and changing the character of local neighbourhoods – as residential amenities and shops are replaced by tourist cafes and souvenir stands.

Cruise tourists contribute little economically to the places they visit. In Venice, short stay day trippers – including cruise tourists – account for 73% of all visitors, yet only contribute to 18% of the tourism economy. By contrast, overnight visitors contribute 50%.

In Venice, campaigners have long been calling for a ban on large cruise ships entering the historic portion of the city. In 2021, they were successful. Ships weighing over 25,000 tonnes were banned from entering the Venice Lagoon along the Giudecca Canal in an attempt to protect the fragile lagoon ecosystem and to limit the damage to the underwater foundations of the city's historic centre. At the time, UNESCO warned the city could be placed on its endangered list if ships were not diverted to another port.

In 2023, Barcelona Mayor Ada Colau spoke out in favour of limiting the number of cruise ships arriving in the city. Currently up to 200,000 people disembark each month in peak season, Colau's new measures could halve this. In a 2019 study by Transport and Environment, Barcelona ranked as the worst cruise port for air pollution in Europe.

From 2024, only 1,000 cruise passengers per day will be allowed to disembark in Bar Harbor, Maine, United States. The average cruise ship holds 3,000 passengers. The move came after a 2021 survey showed the majority of local residents were unhappy with large cruise ships, and felt that the town was overrun by cruise tourists.

== See also ==
- Cruising (maritime)
- List of busiest cruise ports by passengers
- Vacation
- Yacht charter
