= Silver Spirit (ship) =

Luxury cruise ship operated by Silversea Cruises

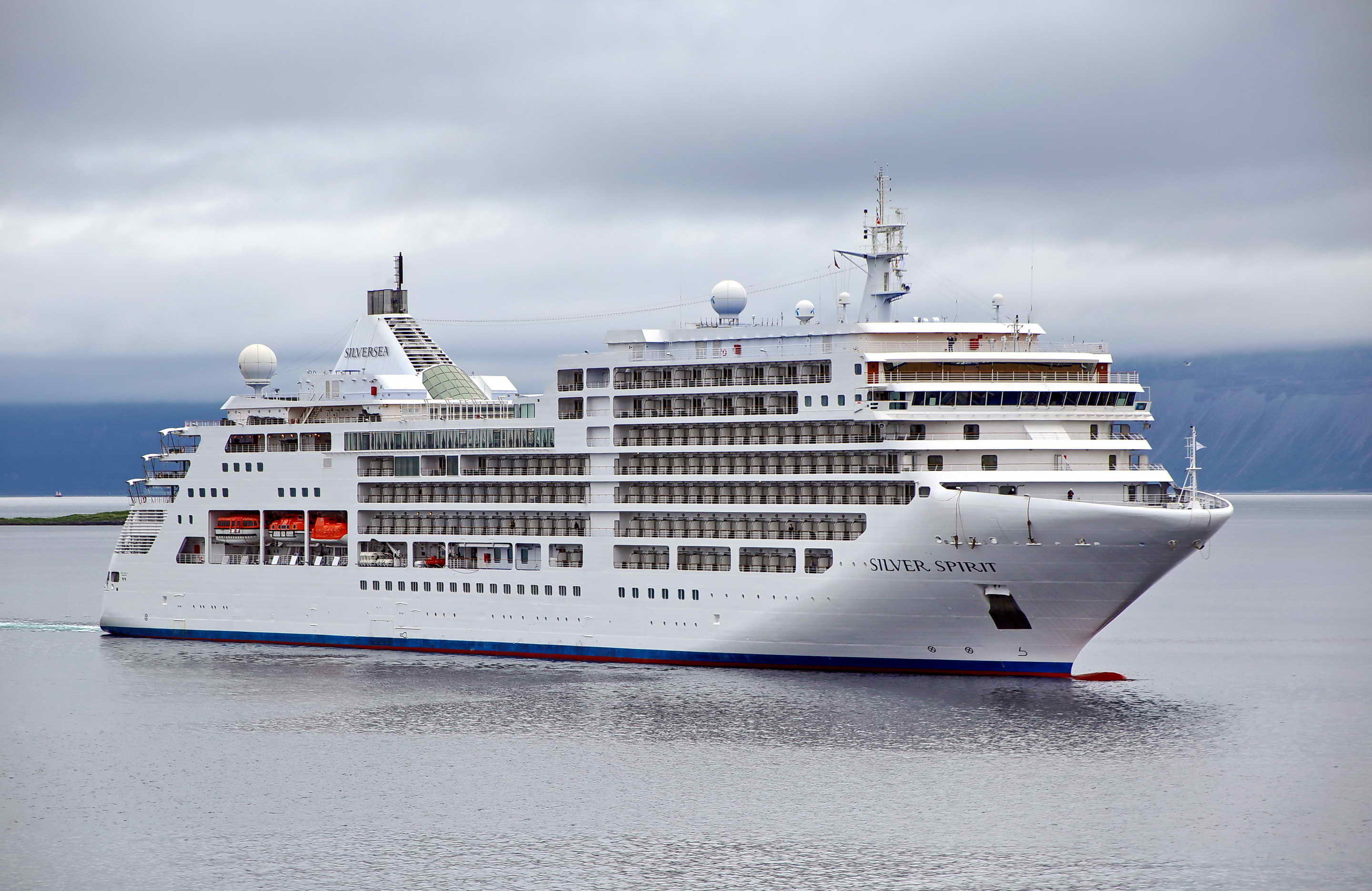
- Silver Spirit in June 2018 approaching Harstad, Norway

History
- Name: Silver Spirit
- Owner: Silversea Cruises
- Operator: Silversea Cruises
- Port of registry: Nassau, Bahamas
- Ordered: 2008
- Builder: Fincantieri Ancona
- Launched: February 27, 2009
- Completed: December 2009
- Identification: Call sign: C6XU6; IMO number: 9437866; MMSI number: 311022500
- Status: In service

General characteristics
- Type: Cruise ship
- Tonnage: 2009–2018: 36,009 GT 2018 onwards: 39,519 GT
- Length: 2009–2018: 195.8 m; 2018 onwards: 210.7 m
- Beam: 89 ft (27 m)
- Speed: 20.3 knots (37.6 km/h) (est)
- Capacity: 608 passengers (double occupancy); 648 (maximum passengers)
- Crew: 412

Silver Spirit is a luxury cruise ship operated by Silversea Cruises. The sixth ship of the Silversea fleet, she entered service in 2009.

== Description ==
Silver Spirit is fitted with 270 ocean-view suites, the suites of the fleet. She also features six different restaurants, an 8,300 square feet (770 m^{2}) spa, and a supper club with live music, dancing and night-club style entertainment.

On 23 December 2009, Silver Spirit departed on her maiden voyage from Barcelona, Spain to Lisbon, Portugal. Following this sailing, she undertook her maiden transatlantic voyage from Lisbon to Ft. Lauderdale, Florida. On 21 January 2010, Silver Spirit embarked on her inaugural transoceanic voyage, a 91-day voyage around America. Red Sea Cruises is chartering the ship for summer 2020.

== Dry dock ==
In March 2018, Silver Spirit underwent significant renovation. In a two-month refurbishment the ship was cut in half and an additional section was added. She grew from 195.8 to 210.7 meters long. Her tonnage increased from 36,009 to 39,519 GT, and capacity - from 540 to 608 passengers.
