= Silver Whisper =

Cruise ship

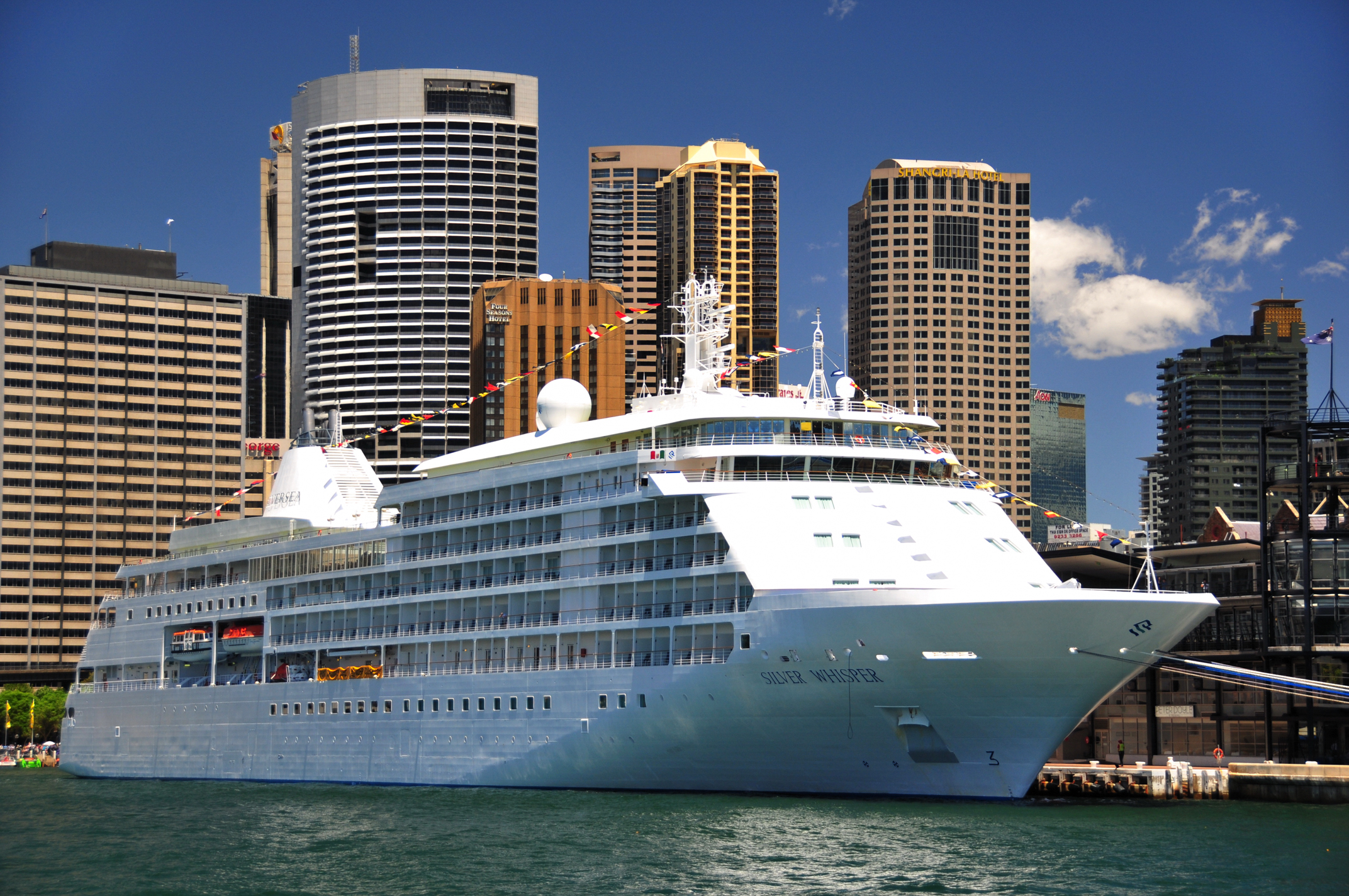
- Silver Whisper docked in Sydney Harbour in 2010

History
- Name: Silver Whisper
- Operator: Silversea Cruises
- Port of registry: Nassau Bahamas
- Builder: Mariotti Shipyard in Genoa, Italy
- Launched: 2 February 2000
- Christened: June 18, 2001 by Marzia Lefebvre D'Ovidio
- In service: 2001-present
- Refit: 2018
- Identification: Call sign: C6FN7; IMO number: 9192179; MMSI number: 308322000
- Status: In Service

General characteristics
- Type: Cruise ship
- Tonnage: 28,258 GT
- Length: 610 ft (190 m)
- Beam: 81.8 ft (24.9 m)
- Draft: 19.6 ft (6.0 m)
- Decks: 10
- Installed power: 2 × Wärtsilä 8R46 (2 × 7,850 kW )
- Propulsion: Two Wärtsilä 8R46 engines; two controllable pitch propellers
- Speed: 21 knots (39 km/h; 24 mph)
- Capacity: 388 passengers
- Crew: 302

Silver Whisper is a cruise ship that entered service in 2001, and is operated by Silversea Cruises. The passenger capacity is 382 passengers, and there are 295 crew members. Her sister ship is Silver Shadow; both ships were built by the Mariotti Shipyard in Genoa, Italy. They both have a high space-to-passenger ratio—the ship's gross tonnage divided by the passenger capacity—at 74, providing more space per passenger than many other cruise ships. [The reduction in passengers to 740 on Crystal Serenity and to 606 on Crystal Symphony makes those ships higher at 93 an 84, respectively.] The passenger-to-crew ratio is also high, at 1.31 to 1.

== Accommodations ==
There are 194 outside suites, ranging in size from 287 square feet (26.7 m^{2}) to 1,435 square feet (133.3 m^{2}); 80% of which feature teak balconies.

== Destinations ==
On 6 January 2020, Silver Whisper, left Fort Lauderdale, Florida, to begin a journey that was to take 140 days to visit 62 port of calls on all seven continents. In March 2020, Silver Whisper was forced to end the Legends of Cruising world cruise due to the outbreak of the COVID-19 pandemic.
