= Antonio Lefebvre d'Ovidio =

Italian lawyer and businessman

Antonio Lefebvre d'Ovidio di Balsorano
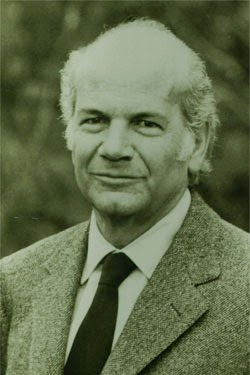
- Born: January 17, 1913; Naples, Italy
- Died: February 5, 2011 (aged 98); Rome, Italy
- Known for: Maritime law, Silversea Cruises

Antonio Lefebvre d'Ovidio di Balsorano di Clunières (17 January 1913 – 5 February 2011) was an Italian lawyer and businessman of a noble origin, and the founder of Silversea Cruises.

In Italy, he is referred to as the father of modern maritime law.

== Biography ==
Antonio Lefebvre d'Ovidio di Balsorano di Clunières was born in Naples in 1913 to a noble Neapolitan family of counts of Balsorano. The Lefebvres were Catholics who fled in 1627–1628 during the war between the French royal forces of King Louis XIII and the Huguenots of La Rochelle, moved to Grenoble and then arrived in Italy with Napoleon. In Naples, they opened a bank, set up a paper mill, founded a printing house and installed the first gas lighting.

Up until World War II, Antonio Lefebvre d'Ovidio was a senior officer in Corps of the Port Captaincies. Lefebvre also worked as a maritime lawyer and taught maritime and commercial law at the Bari University. In 1938, he became a professor. He subsequently held assumed professorships at Bari and Naples Universities. In 1944, he taught a course of maritime law at the Institute of Maritime Law of the La Sapienza, and headed the Institute in 1964–65. Lefebvre d'Ovidio opened legal studious in Bari, Naples, and Rome. He also worked as a business lawyer and consultant to public industrial groups and families in the north of Italy, including Finmeccanica, Fincantieri, Montedison, Bastogi, BNL, and others.

In 1948, he resumed the publication of Rivista del Diritto della Navigazione, a journal on maritime law founded by Antonio Scialoja in 1935. Lefebvre led the publication until it was closed in 1972.

Later, Lefebvre began buying cargo ships and ferries in the Adriatic. He went on to own Sitmar Cruises, which was merged with Princess Cruises in 1988 to form Silversea Cruises. Its first ship, Silver Cloud, was built in 1994.

In 1965–1977, he was President of the Merchant Navy High Council.

In 1975, he was honoured with a state award Gold Medal of Merit for Science and Culture.

He died aged 98 on 5 February 2011.

== Family and personal life ==
He married Eugenia Beck, of German origin, the couple had four kids: Maria Desiderata (Maruzza), Elvira, Manfredi, and Francesco. Maria Desiderata died prematurely from cancer, in her honour in 1999 Antonio and Eugenia Lefebvre established Fondazione Maruzza Lefebvre D’Ovidio Onlus, a non-profit that promotes the culture of paediatric palliative care, research and training for professionals who care for children with incurable diseases.

Lefebvre's son, Manfredi Lefebvre d'Ovidio, became the chairman and owner of Silversea.

According to the recollections of Manfredi, his father Lefebvre d'Ovidio had many friends among Italian political elite: Giovanni Leone, Francesco De Martino, Mariano Rumor, Arnaldo Forlani, and Giulio Andreotti were frequent guests in their family home in Parioli. Giovanni Leone became the godfather of Lefebvre's son Francesco.

== Controversy ==
=== Lockheed scandal ===
Together with his brother Ovidio, Antonio Lefebvre was convicted in 1979 for corruption connected to $1.6 million in bribes Lockheed paid in connection with the Italian Air Force's 1970 purchase of 14 military transport aircraft. He was sentenced to two years and two months in prison, the brother received two months more. At the time of event, Antonio Lefebvre was Lockheed's consultant in Italy and President of the Merchant Navy High Council. In court he confirmed that in 1971 he had handed over a suitcase full of money to an aide of Mario Tanassi.

=== Other cases ===
Lefebvre d'Ovidio was also investigated on suspicion of financial fraud and bribery during Processo Enimont.

As a lawyer, he was also known for high-profile case of Cantieri Navali Riuniti, when major defects in shipbuilding contracts and assembly operations were discovered,where he stood against Giovanni Battista Forzinetti.

== Selected works ==
- Codice della Navigazione italiana (1939-1942);
- Teoria generale delle avarie comuni (1938);
- La nazionalità delle società commerciali (1939);
- La riforma legislativa nel campo della navigazione (1943);
- Istituzioni di diritto commerciale nordamericano (1945);
- Manuale di diritto della navigazione (1950, ed ediz. successive) with Gabriele Pescatore e Leopoldo Tullio;
- Studi per il Codice di Diritto della Navigazione (1951).

== Heritage ==
Antonio Lefebvre D’Ovidio Di Balsorano Philanthropy was established in his honour in 2024. The Philanthropy collaborates with the Luiss University in Rome and funds scholarships for academic researchers. It also sponsors the Rivista del Diritto della Navigazione, and supports Maruzza Foundation.

== Sources ==
- Albano, Rafaele (1956). "Sezione I civile; sentenza 16 febbraio 1955, n. 452; Pres. Acampora P., Est. Lorizio, P. M. Toro (concl. conf.); Cantieri navali riuniti (Avv. Lefebvre D'Ovidio) c. Forzinetti (Avv. Cipolla) e Ministeri tesoro e marina mercantile (Avv. della Stato Calenda)". Il Foro Italiano. 79: 219/220–225/226.
- Vespa, Bruno (2010). Storia d'Italia da Mussolini a Berlusconi. Edizioni Mondadori.
