= Silver Shadow (ship) =

Cruise ship since 2000

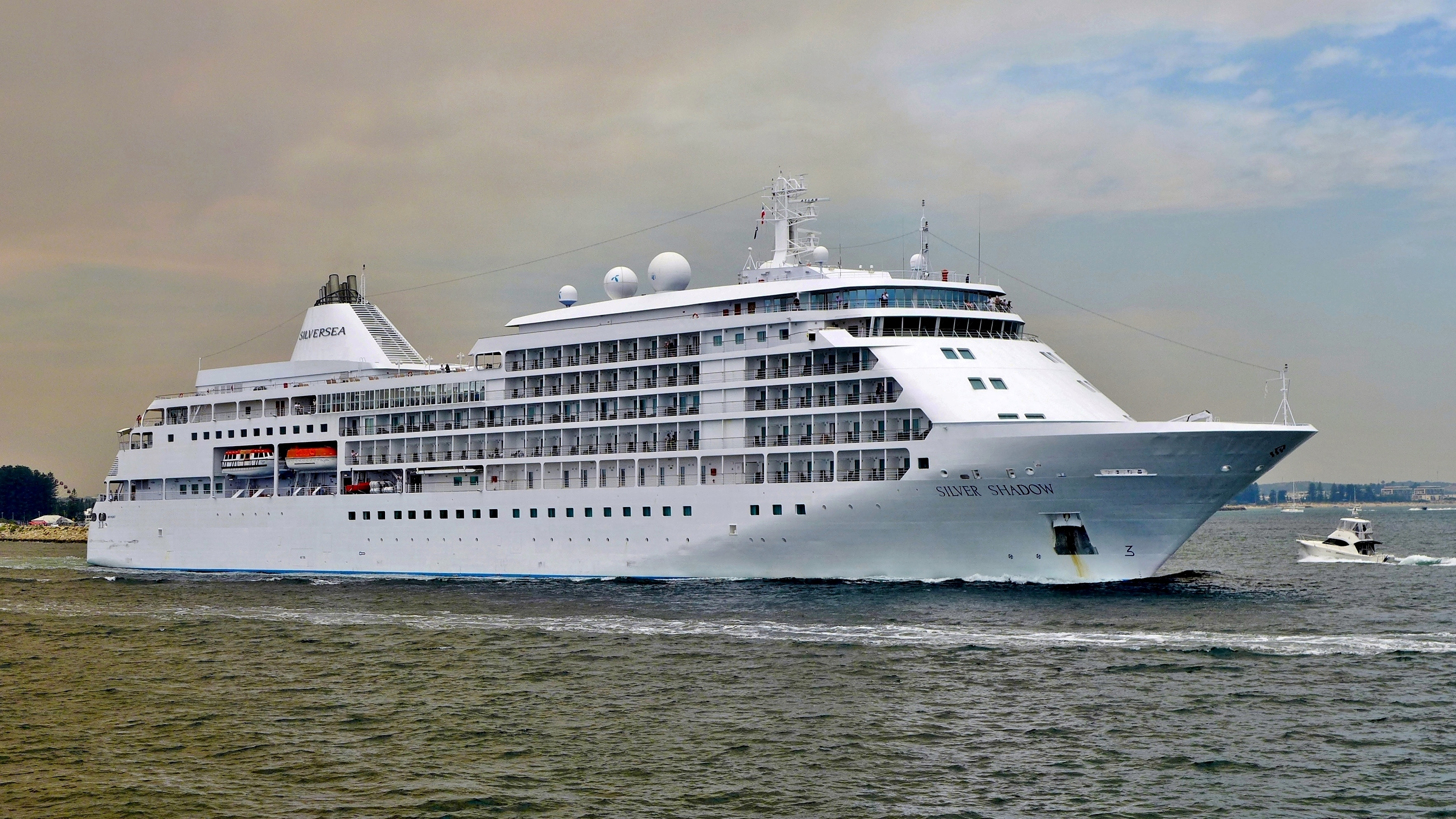
- Silver Shadow departing Fremantle, Australia, in 2018

History
- Name: Silver Shadow
- Operator: Silversea Cruises
- Port of registry: Nassau, Bahamas
- Builder: T. Mariotti S.p.A., Genoa
- Launched: 9 October 1999
- Completed: 31 August 2000
- In service: 2000
- Identification: Call sign: C6FN6; IMO number: 9192167; MMSI number: 308628000
- Status: In service

General characteristics
- Type: Cruise ship
- Tonnage: 28,258 GT
- Length: 186 m (610 ft 3 in)
- Beam: 24.8 m (81 ft 4 in)
- Draft: 6 m (19 ft 8 in)
- Decks: 10
- Speed: 18.5 knots (34.3 km/h; 21.3 mph)
- Capacity: 388 passengers
- Crew: 295

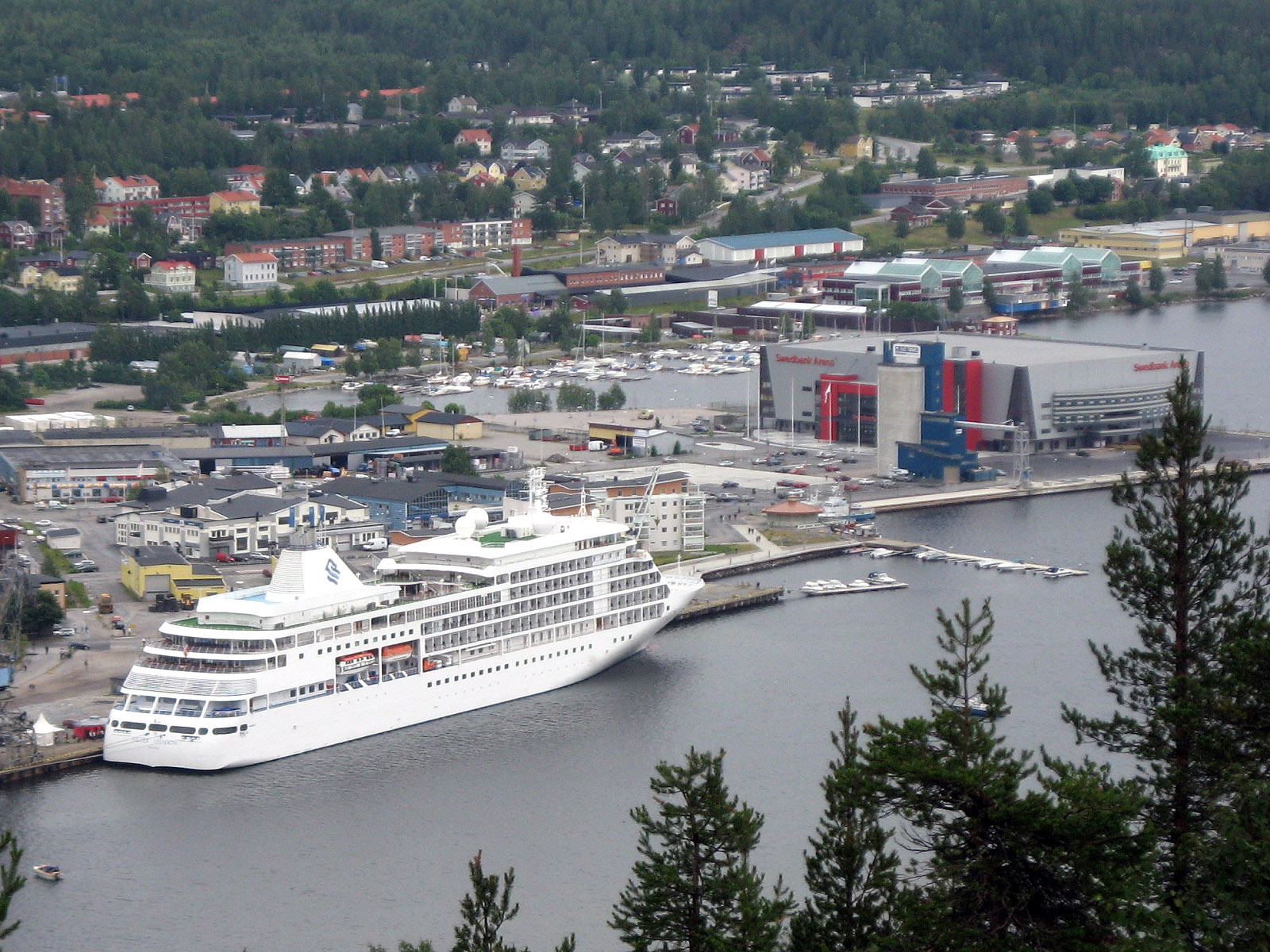
MV Silver Shadow in Örnsköldsvik, Sweden

Silver Shadow is a cruise ship that entered service in 2000, and is operated by Silversea Cruises. The passenger capacity is 382 passengers, and there are 295 crew members. Her sister ship is Silver Whisper, and both ships were built by the Mariotti Shipyard in Genoa, Italy. They both have a high space-to-passenger ratio at 74, providing more space per passenger than any other cruise ship. Space ratio is calculated by dividing a vessel's gross tonnage by its passenger capacity. The passenger-to-crew ratio is also high, at 1.31 to 1.

== Accommodations ==
There are 194 outside suites, ranging in size from 287 square feet (26.7 m^{2}) to 1,435 square feet (133.3 m^{2}), and some 80% of them feature teak balconies.

== Incidents ==
On the morning of 16 March 2012, Silver Shadow collided with another ship in thick fog off Vietnam. She was about five miles (8.0 km) off the coast in Ha Long Bay when the accident occurred. There were reports of damage to the container ship and unconfirmed container ship crew injuries. There were no reports of injuries on Silver Shadow, which passengers described as receiving some damage to her bow. Silver Shadow continued her voyage 90 minutes later.

On 17 June 2013, in Skagway, Alaska, the ship failed a surprise inspection conducted by the Centers for Disease Control and Prevention (CDC). Crew members had alerted inspectors that supervisors ordered them to store food in their living spaces, not in refrigerators, in order to hide the food from inspectors. The lead inspector ordered contaminated foods be discarded. He personally poured concentrated bleach on the food as it was thrown away to ensure it would not be salvaged and served later. The CDC has no authority to fine or detain a ship, so the ship was allowed to continue with its passengers.

On 12 March 2020, the ship was detained in Recife, Brazil due to a 79-year-old Canadian man suspected of having COVID-19. He and his wife were landed and taken to the Real Hospital Português, where it was confirmed that he had the novel coronavirus. The wife, who was asymptomatic when she left the ship, was diagnosed with the virus on 17 March. The man died of the disease on 26 March. From 20 to 22 March, 343 people of different nationalities disembarked, divided into five groups depending on their nationalities and flights back to their countries of origin. The flights were provided by Silversea Cruises. After inspection by the Brazilian National Sanitary Surveillance Agency, the ship set sail on 26 March towards Cape Verde with 266 crew members.
