= List of ship launches in 2011 =

The list of ship launches in 2011 includes a chronological list of ships launched in 2011.

Date	Ship	Class / type	Builder	Location	Country	Notes
6 January	Ambush	Astute-class submarine	BAE Systems Submarines	Barrow-in-Furness	United Kingdom	For Royal Navy
22 January	Leonora Christina	Fast passenger ferry	Austal	Perth	Australia	For BornholmerFærgen
25 January	Sudarshini	Barque, sail training ship	Goa Shipyard	Vasco da Gama	India	For Indian Navy
28 January	Arklow Bridge		Bodewes Shipyard	Hoogezand	Netherlands	For Arklow Shipping
29 January	Flinter Atlantic		Ferus Smit	Westerbroek	Netherlands	
12 February	Anchorage	San Antonio-class amphibious transport dock	Northrop Grumman Ship Systems	New Orleans, Louisiana	United States	For United States Navy
16 February	Polarcus Samur	Survey vessel	Dubai Drydocks	Dubai	United Arab Emirates	For Polarcus
17 February	Canberra	Canberra-class landing helicopter dock	Navantia	Ferrol	Spain	For Royal Australian Navy
18 February	Fraserborg		Ferus Smit	Leer	Germany	For Wagenborg Shipping
18 February	Spirit of France	Spirit-class ferry	STX Europe Rauma shipyard	Rauma	Finland	For P&O Ferries
19 February	Santa Cruz	Santa-class container ship	Daewoo Shipbuilding & Marine Engineering	Okpo	Republic of Korea	For Hamburg Süd
26 February	Río Segura	Patrol boat	Astilleros Gondán		Spain	For Guardia Civil
26 February	MSC Taranto	MSC Danit-type container ship	Daewoo Shipbuilding & Marine Engineering	Geoje	Republic of Korea	
27 February	AIDAsol	Sphinx-class cruise ship	Meyer Werft	Papenburg	Germany	For AIDA Cruises
8 March	Louhi	Oil spill response vessel	Uudenkaupungin Työvene	Uusikaupunki	Finland	For Finnish Navy
9 March	CSCL Jupiter	CSCL Star-class container ship	Samsung Heavy Industries	Geoje	Republic of Korea	For China Shipping Container Lines
9 March	Gülbeniz A	VW 2500-type container ship	P + S Werften	Stralsund	Germany	
12 March	Santa Rita	Santa-class container ship	Daewoo Shipbuilding & Marine Engineering	Okpo	Republic of Korea	For Hamburg Süd
17 March	Victoria Mathias	Seabreeze-class wind turbine installation vessel	Daewoo Shipbuilding & Marine Engineering	Geoje	Republic of Korea	For RWE Innogy
21 March	Tornado	Buque de Acción Marítima	Navantia	San Fernando, Cádiz	Spain	For Armada Española
29 March	Akademik Tryoshnikov	Research vessel	Admiralty Shipyard	Saint Petersburg	Russia	For Arctic and Antarctic Research Institute
9 April	MSC Fillippa	MSC Fabiola-type container ship	Samsung Heavy Industries	Geoje	Republic of Korea	For Mediterranean Shipping Company
13 April	Berge Everest	Valemax	Bohai Shipbuilding Heavy Industry	Huludao, Liaoning Province	China	For Berge Bulk
15 April	Boiky	Steregushchy-class corvette	Severnaya Verf	Saint Petersburg	Russia	For Russian Navy
15 April	CPO Ancona	MSC Danit-type container ship	Daewoo Shipbuilding & Marine Engineering	Geoje	Republic of Korea	
16 April	William McLean	Lewis and Clark-class dry cargo ship	National Steel and Shipbuilding Company	San Diego, California	United States	For United States Naval Service
20 April	Numptia	Luxury yacht	Rossinavi	Viareggio, Italy	Italy	
21 April	Groningen	Holland-class offshore patrol vessel	Damen Shipyard	Galați	Romania	For Royal Netherlands Navy
21 April	Bernard C. Webber	Sentinel-class cutter	Bollinger Shipyards	Lockport, Louisiana	United States	For United States Coast Guard
27 April	Bonn	Berlin-class replenishment ship	Peene Shipyard	Wolgast	Germany	For German Navy
29 April	CSCL Mercury	CSCL Star-class container ship	Samsung Heavy Industries	Geoje	Republic of Korea	For China Shipping Container Lines
April	Friedrich Ernestine	Seabreeze-class wind turbine installation vessel	Daewoo Shipbuilding & Marine Engineering	Geoje	Republic of Korea	For RWE Innogy
2 May	Santa Rosa	Santa-class container ship	Daewoo Shipbuilding & Marine Engineering	Okpo	Republic of Korea	For Hamburg Süd
8 May	Michael Murphy	Arleigh Burke-class destroyer	Bath Iron Works	Bath, Maine	United States	For United States Navy
17 May	Kennewick	Kwa-di Tabil-class ferry	Vigor Shipyards		United States	For Washington State Ferries
21 May	Sumedha	Saryu-class patrol vessel	Goa Shipyard	Vasco da Gama, Goa	India	For Indian Navy
25 May	Trikand	Talwar-class frigate	Yantar Shipyard	Kaliningrad	Russia	For Indian Navy
25 May	Alexander von Humboldt II	Sail training ship	Brenn- und Verformtechnik	Bremen	Germany	For Deutsche Stiftung Sail Training, Bremerhaven
May	Gayratly	Project 12418 missile corvette	Sredne-Nevsky Shipyard	Saint Petersburg	Russia	For Turkmenistan Navy
3 June	Celebrity Silhouette	Solstice-class cruise ship	Meyer Werft	Papenburg	Germany	For Celebrity Cruises
4 June	Rickmers Inchon	type Superflex Heavy MPC container ship	Nanjing Jinling Shipyard	Nanjing	China	For Rickmers Group
6 June	Vale Rio de Janeiro	Valemax	Daewoo Shipbuilding & Marine Engineering	Okpo-dong, South Gyeongsang Province	Republic of Korea	For Vale Shipping
16 June	Rickmers Busan	type Superflex Heavy MPC container ship	Nanjing Jinling Shipyard	Nanjing	China	For Rickmers Group
18 June	MSC Rapallo	MSC Danit-type container ship	Daewoo Shipbuilding & Marine Engineering	Geoje	Republic of Korea	
25 June	Tom Burmester		GS Yard	Waterhuizen	Netherlands	
25 June	Liberty		GS Yard	Waterhuizen	Netherlands	
9 July	Vale China	Valemax	Jiangsu Rongsheng Heavy Industries		China	For Vale Shipping
13 July	Vale Beijing	Valemax	STX Offshore & Shipbuilding	Jinhae-gu, Changwon	Republic of Korea	For Vale Shipping
13 July	Santa Teresa	Santa-class container ship	Daewoo Shipbuilding & Marine Engineering	Okpo	Republic of Korea	For Hamburg Süd
16 July	Riviera	Oceania-class cruise ship	Fincantieri	Sestri Ponente	Italy	For Oceania Cruises
16 July	Carlo Bergamini	FREMM multipurpose frigate	Fincantieri	Riva Trigoso	Italy	For Italian Navy
21 July	S. A. Agulhas II	Research vessel	STX Finland Rauma shipyard	Rauma	Finland	For South African Department of Environmental Affairs
23 July	Vale Italia	Valemax	Daewoo Shipbuilding & Marine Engineering	Okpo-dong, South Gyeongsang Province	Republic of Korea	For Vale Shipping
29 July	CMA CGM Nevada	MSC Fabiola-type container ship	Samsung Heavy Industries	Geoje	Republic of Korea	For CMA CGM
2 August	Hagland Captain		Chowgule & Co. Pvt. Ltd.		India	For Hagland
6 August	CPO Trieste	MSC Danit-type container ship	Daewoo Shipbuilding & Marine Engineering	Geoje	Republic of Korea	
11 August	Schleswig-Holstein	ferry	Neptun Werft	Rostock	Germany	For Wyker Dampfschiffs-Reederei Föhr-Amrum GmbH
13 August	CSCL Mars	CSCL Star-class container ship	Samsung Heavy Industries	Geoje	Republic of Korea	For China Shipping Container Lines
18 August	Richard Etheridge	Sentinel-class cutter	Bollinger Shipyards	Lockport, Louisiana	United States	For United States Coast Guard
19 August	Seatruck Progress	Ro-ro ferry	Flensburger Schiffbau-Gesellschaft	Flensburg	Germany	For Seatruck Ferries
August	Edermen	Project 12418 missile corvette	Sredne-Nevsky Shipyard	Saint Petersburg	Russia	For Turkmenistan Navy
2 September	MSC Preziosa	Fantasia-class cruise ship	STX France	Saint-Nazaire	France	For MSC Cruises
3 September	MSC Divina	Fantasia-class cruise ship	STX France	Saint-Nazaire	France	For MSC Cruises
4 September	Berge Aconcagua	Valemax	Bohai Shipbuilding Heavy Industry	Huludao, Liaoning Province	China	For Berge Bulk
12 September	Spearhead	Spearhead-class expeditionary fast transport	Austal USA	Blakeley Island, Mobile, Alabama	United States	For United States Naval Service
13 September	Mississippi	Virginia-class submarine	General Dynamics Electric Boat		United States	For US Navy
14 September	Mohammed VI	FREMM multipurpose frigate	DCNS	Lorient	France	For Royal Moroccan Navy
20 September	Azmat	Azmat-class fast attack craft	China State Shipbuilding Corporation	Jiangnan Shipyard	China	For Pakistan Navy
21 September	MSC Clorinda	MSC Danit-type container ship	Daewoo Shipbuilding & Marine Engineering	Geoje	Republic of Korea	
27 September	Büyükada	Ada-class corvette	Tuzla Naval Shipyard	Tuzla, Istanbul	Turkey	For Turkish Navy
28 September	Tagbanua	Landing Craft Utility	Philippine Iron Construction and Marine Works		Philippines	For Philippine Navy
29 September	Puyallup	Valiant-class harbor tug	J.M. Martinac Shipbuilding Corp.	Tacoma, Washington	United States	For United States Navyr
30 September	Finnborg		Ferus Smit	Leer	Germany	For Wagenborg Shipping
5 October	MSC Ariane	MSC Danit-type container ship	Daewoo Shipbuilding & Marine Engineering	Geoje	Republic of Korea	
8 October	CSCL Saturn	CSCL Star-class container ship	Samsung Heavy Industries	Geoje	Republic of Korea	For China Shipping Container Lines
14 October	Bruno Gregoretti	Offshore patrol vessel	Cantiere Navale Megaride	Naples	Italy	For Italian Coast Guard
21 October	Lady Anna	Sea River Liner 3700 coastal ship	GS Yard	Waterhuizen	Netherlands	For Wijnne Barends
25 October	Kadmatt	Kamorta-class corvette	Garden Reach Shipbuilders & Engineers	Kolkata	India	For Indian Navy
27 October	Eeborg		Koninklijke Niestern Sander	Delfzijl	Netherlands	For Wagenborg Shipping
28 October	Seatruck Power	Ro-ro ferry	Flensburger Schiffbau-Gesellschaft	Flensburg	Germany	For Seatruck Ferries
29 October	Medgar Evers	Lewis and Clark-class dry cargo ship	National Steel and Shipbuilding Company	San Diego, California	United States	For United States Naval Service
1 November	Aiviq	Anchor handling tug supply vessel	LaShip shipyard	Houma, Louisiana	United States	For Edison Chouest Offshore
1 November	Vale Dalian	Valemax	Jiangsu Rongsheng Heavy Industries		China	For Vale Shipping
2 November	Vale Dongjiakou	Valemax	Jiangsu Rongsheng Heavy Industries		China	For Vale Shipping
5 November	MSC Vandya	MSC Danit-type container ship	Daewoo Shipbuilding & Marine Engineering	Geoje	Republic of Korea	
10 November	Vale Qingdao	Valemax	STX Offshore & Shipbuilding	Jinhae-gu, Changwon	Republic of Korea	For Vale Shipping
15 November	U-35	Type 212 submarine	HDW	Kiel	Germany	For German Navy
19 November	MSC Aurora	MSC Danit-type container ship	Daewoo Shipbuilding & Marine Engineering	Geoje	Republic of Korea	
29 November	William Flores	Sentinel-class cutter	Bollinger Shipyards	Lockport, Louisiana	United States	For United States Coast Guard
3 December	Krabi	River-class patrol vessel	Bangkok Dock Company	Portsmouth	Thailand	For Royal Thai Navy
16 December	Lady Anneke	Sea-River Liner 3700 coastal ship	GS Yard	Waterhuizen	Netherlands	For Wijnne Barends
20 December	Vale Hebei	Valemax	Jiangsu Rongsheng Heavy Industries		China	For Vale Shipping
24 December	Vale Malaysia	Valemax	Daewoo Shipbuilding & Marine Engineering	Okpo-dong, South Gyeongsang Province	Republic of Korea	For Vale Shipping
29 December	Berge Jaya	Valemax	Bohai Shipbuilding Heavy Industry	Huludao, Liaoning Province	China	For Berge Bulk
30 December	CSCL Uranus	CSCL Star-class container ship	Samsung Heavy Industries	Geoje	Republic of Korea	For China Shipping Container Lines
31 December	Santa Ursula	Santa-class container ship	Daewoo Shipbuilding & Marine Engineering	Okpo	Republic of Korea	For Hamburg Süd
Unknown date	Cape Coast	Container ship			Republic of Korea	
Unknown date	Copenhagen	Kaap Green Tanker liquid cargo barge	Scheepswerf De Kaap B.V.	Meppel	Netherlands	For GMS Copenhagen B.V.
Unknown date	Dalby Esk	Crew transfer vessel	Alnmaritec Ltd.	Blyth	United Kingdom	For Dalby Offshore Services Ltd.
Unknown date	Dalby Trent	Crew transfer vessel	Alicat Workboats Ltd.	Great Yarmouth	United Kingdom	For Dalby Marine Ltd.
Unknown date	E. M. S. Viking	Crew transfer vessel	Aluminium Boatbuilding Co. Ltd.	Hayling Island	United Kingdom	For Excel Marine Services Ltd.
Unknown date	Gaillion	Crew transfer vessel	Alicat Workboats Ltd.	Great Yarmouth	United Kingdom	For Gardline Environmental Ltd.
Unknown date	Gardian 7	Crew transfer vessel	Alicat Workboats Ltd.	Great Yarmouth	United Kingdom	For Gardline Environmental Ltd.
Unknown date	Gardian 8	Crew transfer vessel	Arklow Marine Services Inc.	Arklow	Ireland	For Alicat Workboats Ltd.
Unknown date	Marianarray	Crew transfer vessel	Alicat Workboats Ltd.	Great Yarmouth	United Kingdom	For Gardline Environmental Ltd.
Unknown date	The Princess Royal	Research ship	Alnmaritec Ltd.	Blyth	United Kingdom	For Newcastle University.
Unknown date	Wind Transfer	Crew transfer vessel	Alnmaritec Ltd.	Blyth	United Kingdom	For Ørsted.
