= Celebrity Reflection =

Solstice-class cruise ship

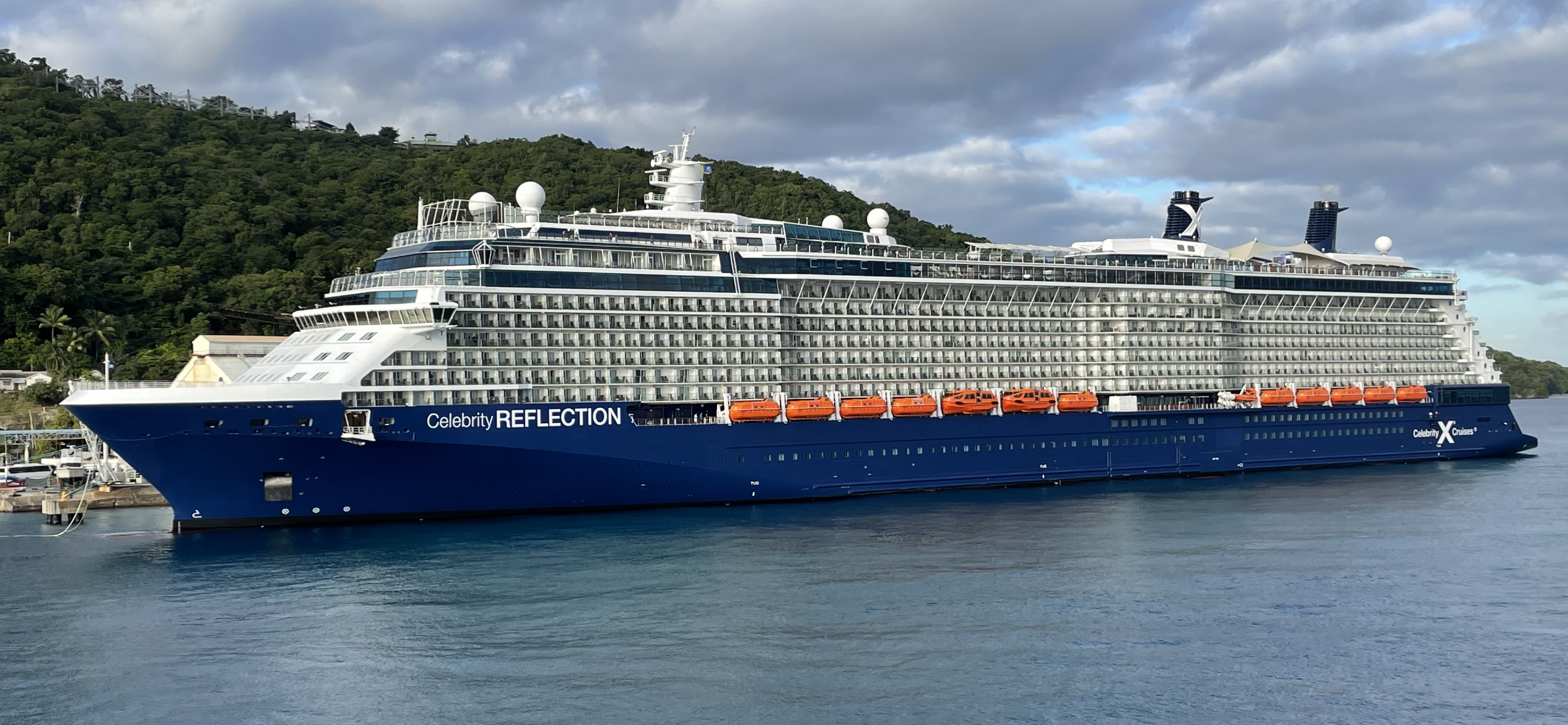
- Celebrity Reflection in Ocho Rios, Jamaica, 2023

History

Malta
- Name: Celebrity Reflection
- Owner: Royal Caribbean Group
- Operator: Celebrity Cruises
- Port of registry: Valletta, Malta
- Ordered: 24 March 2011
- Builder: Meyer Werft, Papenburg
- Cost: US$750 million
- Yard number: S. 691
- Laid down: September 2011
- Launched: 11/12 August 2012
- Sponsored by: Jovanka Goronjic; Megan Mathie; Helen O'Connell; Rosey Rodriguez
- Christened: 1 December 2012
- Acquired: 9 October 2012
- Maiden voyage: 12 October 2012
- In service: 2012–present
- Identification: IMO number: 9506459; MMSI number: 229074000; Call sign: 9HA3047
- Status: In service

General characteristics
- Class & type: Solstice-class cruise ship
- Tonnage: 125,366 GT; 9,500 DWT
- Length: 319 m (1,047 ft)
- Beam: 37.4 m (123 ft)
- Draught: 8.6 m (28 ft)
- Decks: 17
- Installed power: 2 × MAN 14V48/60CR 16,800 kW (22,500 hp); 2 × MAN 12V48/60CR 14,400 kW (19,300 hp)
- Propulsion: 2 × ABB XO Azipods 17,500 kW (23,500 hp)
- Speed: 24 kn (44 km/h; 28 mph)
- Capacity: 3,046
- Crew: 1,271

Celebrity Reflection is the fifth, final, and largest Solstice-class cruise ship, her sister ships being Celebrity Equinox, Celebrity Eclipse, Celebrity Solstice and Celebrity Silhouette. Solstice, Equinox, Eclipse and Silhouette entered service in 2008, 2009, 2010, and 2011 respectively. Reflection was launched in 2012. Since October 2012, it has been owned and operated by Celebrity Cruises. It has one more deck than other Solstice-class cruise ships. The ship can accommodate 3,046 passengers, second only to the Celebrity Beyond (at 3,260) in the Celebrity fleet.

Celebrity Reflection last dry dock was in October 2022. This refurbishing included regular maintenance, a general refresh and the change to the new dark blue color scheme of Celebrity first showcased on Celebrity Edge.
