= List of ship launches in 1977 =

The list of ship launches in 1977 includes a chronological list of all ships launched in 1977.

Date	Ship	Class / type	Builder	Location	Country	Notes
1 January	Stump	Spruance-class destroyer	Ingalls Shipbuilding	Pascagoula, Mississippi	United States	
17 January	Oguta	Patrol boat	Brooke Marine Ltd.	Lowestoft	United Kingdom	For Nigerian Navy.
22 January	Espresso Venezia	Espresso Livorno-class ferry	Cant. Nav. "Luigi Orlando"	Livorno	Italy	For Tirrenia di Navigazione
29 January	Jan Heweliusz	ferry	Trosvik Verksted A/S	Brevik	Norway	For Polskie Linie Oceaniczne
3 February	Kharg	Ol-class tanker (1965)	Swan Hunter	Wallsend-on-Tyne	United Kingdom	For Imperial Iranian Navy
18 February	Cumbria Shore	Offshore supply vessel	Appledore Shipbuilders Ltd.	Appledore	United Kingdom	For Offshore Marine Ltd.
19 February	Cincinnati	Los Angeles-class submarine	Newport News Shipbuilding	Newport News, Virginia	United States	
15 March	B.A.E. Huancavilca	Type 209 submarine	Howaldtswerke-Deutsche Werft	Kiel	West Germany	For Fuerza Naval del Ecuador
21 March	Lackenby	Bulk carrier	Harland & Wolff	Belfast, N. Ireland	United Kingdom	For Ropner Shipping.
26 March	Callenburgh	Kortenaer-class frigate	Koninklijke Schelde Groep	Flushing	Netherlands	
11 April	Belleau Wood	Tarawa-class amphibious assault ship	Ingalls Shipbuilding	Pascagoula, Mississippi	United States	
14 April	Al Mujahid	Patrol boat	Brooke Marine Ltd.	Lowestoft	United Kingdom	For Royal Omani Navy.
16 April	Van Kinsbergen	Kortenaer-class frigate	Koninklijke Schelde Groep	Flushing	Netherlands	
3 May	Invincible	Invincible-class aircraft carrier	Vickers Shipbuilding and Engineering	Barrow-in-Furness	United Kingdom	
4 May	Emory S. Land	Emory S. Land-class submarine tender	Lockheed Shipbuilding	Seattle, Washington	United States	
5 May	RMV Scillonian III	Ferry	Appledore Shipbuilders	Appledore	United Kingdom	For Isles of Scilly Steamship Company
5 May	S.A. Helderberg	The Big Whites-type refrigerated cargo ship	Chantiers de France	Dunkerque	France	For Deutsche West-Afrika-Linie
18 May	Battleaxe	Type 22 frigate	Yarrow Shipbuilders	Glasgow, Scotland	United Kingdom	
19 May	Yaeshio	Uzushio-class submarine			Japan	
21 May	Yūgumo	Yamagumo-class destroyer			Japan	
1 June	Al Jabbar	Patrol boat	Brooke Marine Ltd.	Lowestoft	United Kingdom	For Royal Omani Navy.
3 June	Conolly	Spruance-class destroyer	Ingalls Shipbuilding	Pascagoula, Mississippi	United States	
3 June	Leslie Gault	Bulk carrier	Appledore Shipbuilders Ltd.	Appledore	United Kingdom	For Gallic Shipping Ltd.
4 June	Nerpa	Koni-class frigate	Werft 340	Selenodolsk	Soviet Union	For Soviet Navy
18 June	Coastal Corpus Christi	Supertanker	Harland & Wolff	Belfast, N. Ireland	United Kingdom	For Woodstock Shipping Co.
18 June	New York City	Los Angeles-class submarine	Electric Boat	Groton, Connecticut	United States	
21 June	Dana Anglia	Ferry	Aalborg Værft A/S	Ålborg	Denmark	For DFDS Seaways
30 June	Saturn	Ferry	Ailsa Shipbuilding Company	Troon, Scotland	United Kingdom	For Caledonian MacBrayne
23 July	Moosbrugger	Spruance-class destroyer	Ingalls Shipbuilding	Pascagoula, Mississippi	United States	
30 July	Indianapolis	Los Angeles-class submarine	Electric Boat	Groton, Connecticut	United States	
12 August	Wuppertal		Rickmers Werft	Bremerhaven	West Germany	For JA Reinecke & Co
16 August	Pierre Guillaumat	Batillus-class supertanker	Chantiers de l'Atlantique	Saint-Nazaire, France	France	
Unknown date	Island Scene	Passenger ship	Bideford Shipyard (1973) Ltd	Bideford	United Kingdom	For private owner.
19 August	Gallic Fjord	Bulk carrier	Appledore Shipbuilders Ltd.	Appledore	United Kingdom	For Gallic Shipping Ltd.
12 September	Nessbank	Cargo ship	Sunderland Ship Builders Ltd	Sunderland	United Kingdom	For Bank Line Ltd.
17 September	Tonnant	Redoutable-class submarine	DCNS		France	For French Navy
20 October	Uikku	Product tanker	Nobiskrug	Rendsburg	West Germany	
24 October	TCG Batiray	Type 209 submarine	Howaldtswerke-Deutsche Werft	Kiel	West Germany	For Turkish Naval Forces
28 October	Buraidah		Rauma	Rauma-Repola Oy	Finland	For Fanco N.V. Willemstad
28 October	Commodore Enterprise	Cargo ship	Appledore Shipbuilders Ltd.	Appledore	United Kingdom	For Commodore Transporters Ltd.
29 October	Birmingham	Los Angeles-class submarine	Newport News Shipbuilding	Newport News, Virginia	United States	
29 October	John Hancock	Spruance-class destroyer	Ingalls Shipbuilding	Pascagoula, Mississippi	United States	
11 November	Nicholson	Spruance-class destroyer	Ingalls Shipbuilding	Pascagoula, Mississippi	United States	
16 December	Espresso Ravenna	Espresso Livorno-class ferry	Cant. Nav. "Luigi Orlando"	Livorno	Italy	For Adriatica di Navigazione SpA
Unknown date	Al Aul	Patrol boat	Brooke Marine Ltd.	Lowestoft	United Kingdom	For Royal Omani Navy.
Unknown date	Carebeka IX	Bulk carrier	Bijlsma Lemmer Scheepswerf	Lemmer	Netherlands	
Unknown date	ChangZheng 2	Type 091 nuclear-powered attack submarine	Huludao Shipyard	Huludao, Liaoning	China	
Unknown date	Congener	Fishing trawler	Bideford Shipyard (1973) Ltd	Bideford	United Kingdom	For Allan Morse Jr. and others.
Unknown date	Ilhéu da Mina	Dredger and freighter	Buijs Scheepsbouw	Krimpen aan den IJssel	Netherlands	Currently operated by Açores Madeira
Unknown date	Mashala	Ferry	Rickmers Rederei	Bremerhaven	West Germany	For Mashala Shipping Co.
Unknown date	Oil Clipper 1	Crew boat	Allday Aluminium Ltd.	Gosport	United Kingdom	For Ocean Inchcape.
Unknown date	Oil Clipper 2	Crew boat	Allday Aluminium Ltd.	Gosport	United Kingdom	For Ocean Inchcape.
Unknown date	Oil Clipper 3	Crew boat	Allday Aluminium Ltd.	Gosport	United Kingdom	For Ocean Inchcape.
Unknown date	Oil Clipper 4	Crew boat	Allday Aluminium Ltd.	Gosport	United Kingdom	For Ocean Inchcape.
Unknown date	Oil Clipper 5	Crew boat	Allday Aluminium Ltd.	Gosport	United Kingdom	For Ocean Inchcape.
Unknown date	Oil Clipper 6	Crew boat	Allday Aluminium Ltd.	Gosport	United Kingdom	For Ocean Inchcape.
Unknown date	Oil Clipper 7	Crew boat	Allday Aluminium Ltd.	Gosport	United Kingdom	For Ocean Inchcape.
Unknown date	Oil Cutter 1	Crew boat	Allday Aluminium Ltd.	Gosport	United Kingdom	For Ocean Inchcape.
Unknown date	Oil Cutter 2	Crew boat	Allday Aluminium Ltd.	Gosport	United Kingdom	For Ocean Inchcape.
Unknown date	Oil Cutter 3	Crew boat	Allday Aluminium Ltd.	Gosport	United Kingdom	For Ocean Inchcape.
Unknown date	Oil Cutter 4	Crew boat	Allday Aluminium Ltd.	Gosport	United Kingdom	For Ocean Inchcape.
Unknown date	Oil Cutter 5	Crew boat	Allday Aluminium Ltd.	Gosport	United Kingdom	For Ocean Inchcape.
Unknown date	Oil Cutter 6	Crew boat	Allday Aluminium Ltd.	Gosport	United Kingdom	For Ocean Inchcape.
Unknown date	Poole Belle	Passenger ship	J. Bolson & Son Ltd.	Poole	United Kingdom	For Crosons Ltd.
