= Río Segura =

Río Segura may refer to:

- River Segura
- Río Segura (boat)
