= Celebrity Equinox =

Solstice-class cruise ship

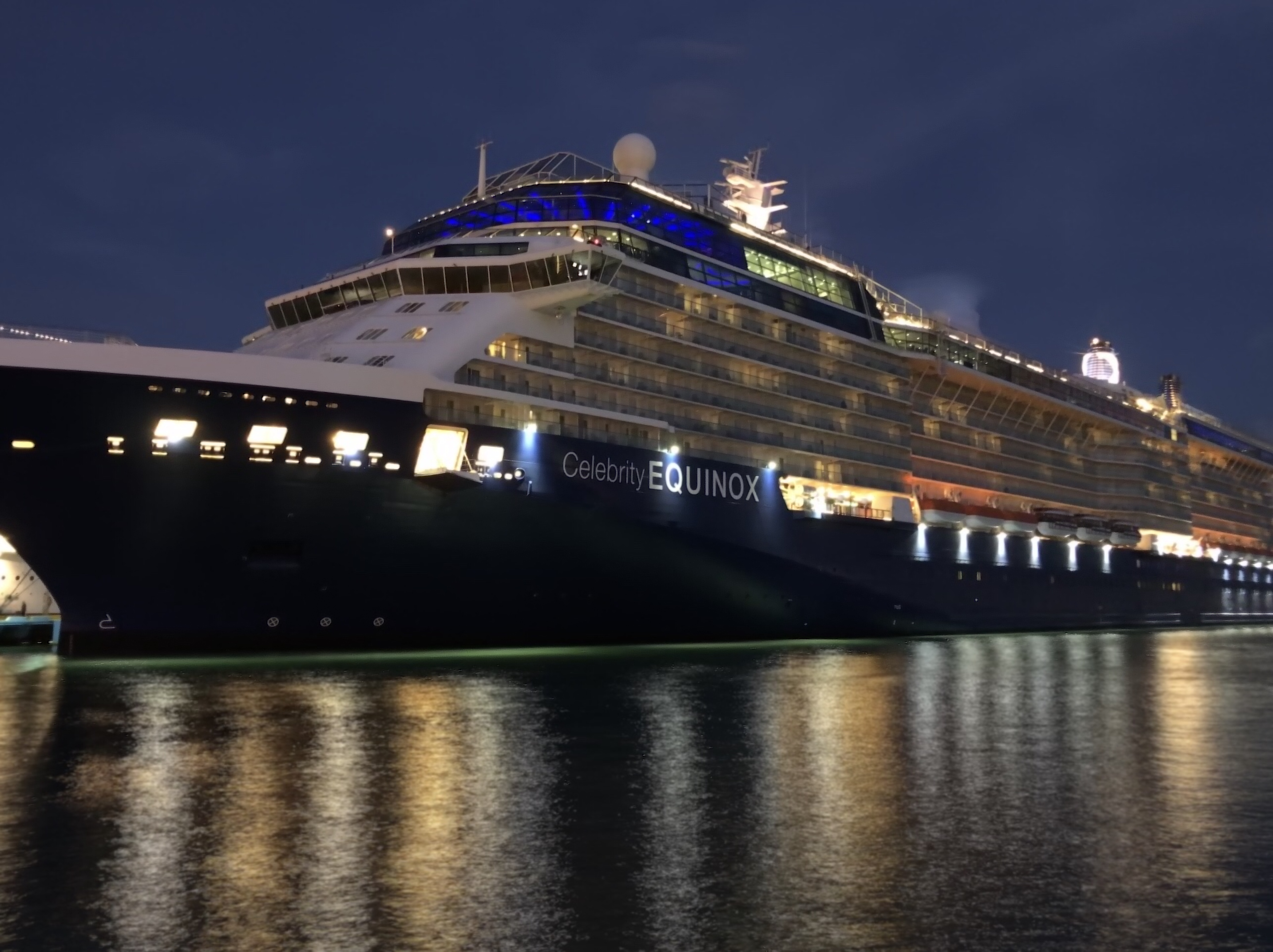
- Celebrity Equinox at San Juan, Puerto Rico in 2019

History
- Name: Celebrity Equinox
- Owner: 2008 onwards: Royal Caribbean Cruises Ltd.
- Operator: Celebrity Cruises
- Port of registry: Valletta, Malta
- Builder: Meyer Werft, Papenburg, Germany
- Cost: US$750 million
- Yard number: 676
- Laid down: 6 August 2008
- Launched: 6 June 2009
- Sponsored by: Nina Barough
- Completed: 2009
- Maiden voyage: July 31, 2009
- In service: 2009–present
- Identification: Call sign: 9HXD9; IMO number: 9372456; MMSI number: 249667000
- Status: Active Service

General characteristics
- Class & type: Solstice-class cruise ship
- Tonnage: 121,878 GT; 82,363 NT; 9,500 DWT
- Length: 317.2 m (1,040 ft 8 in)
- Beam: 36.9 m (121 ft 1 in)
- Draft: 8.3 m (27 ft 3 in)
- Depth: 11.3 m (37 ft 1 in)
- Decks: 19 decks
- Installed power: 4 × Wärtsilä 16V46; 67,200 kW (combined)
- Propulsion: Diesel-electric; two ABB Azipod units
- Speed: 24 knots (44 km/h; 28 mph)
- Capacity: 2,850 passengers
- Crew: approx. 1,250

Celebrity Equinox is a Solstice-class cruise ship built by Meyer Werft in Germany. Celebrity Equinox is the second of the five Solstice-class vessels, owned and operated by Celebrity Cruises. She is a sister ship of Celebrity Solstice, Celebrity Eclipse, Celebrity Silhouette, and the Celebrity Reflection. Construction officially started in September 2007. Celebrity Equinox left the shipyard in June 2009 and entered commercial service for Celebrity Cruises on July 31, 2009.

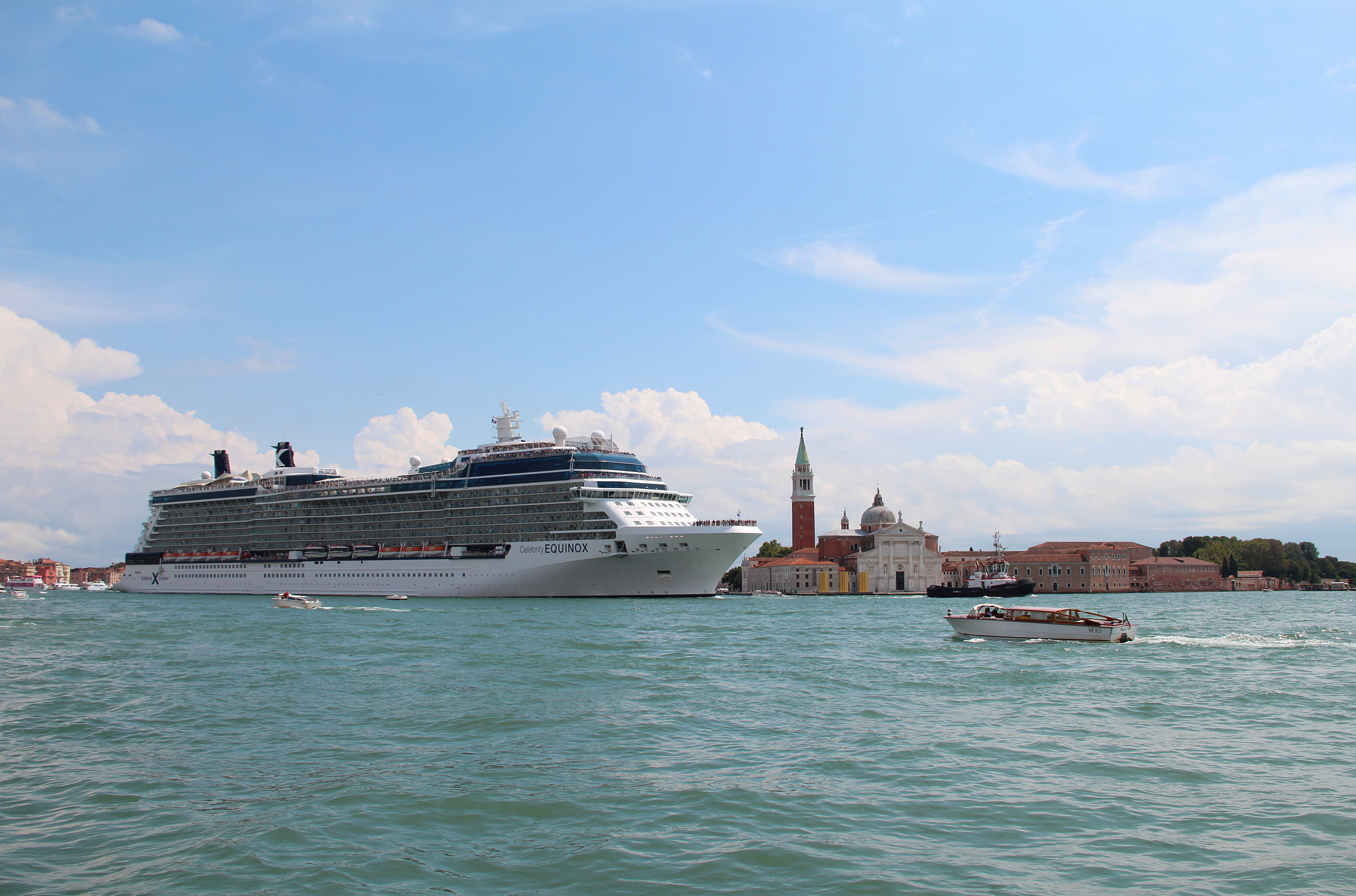
Celebrity Equinox sailing in the Bacino di San Marco off the island of San Giorgio Maggiore

Kate McCue was captain of the Celebrity Equinox until August 2019, and the first American woman to be captain of a "mega" cruise ship.

== Facilities ==
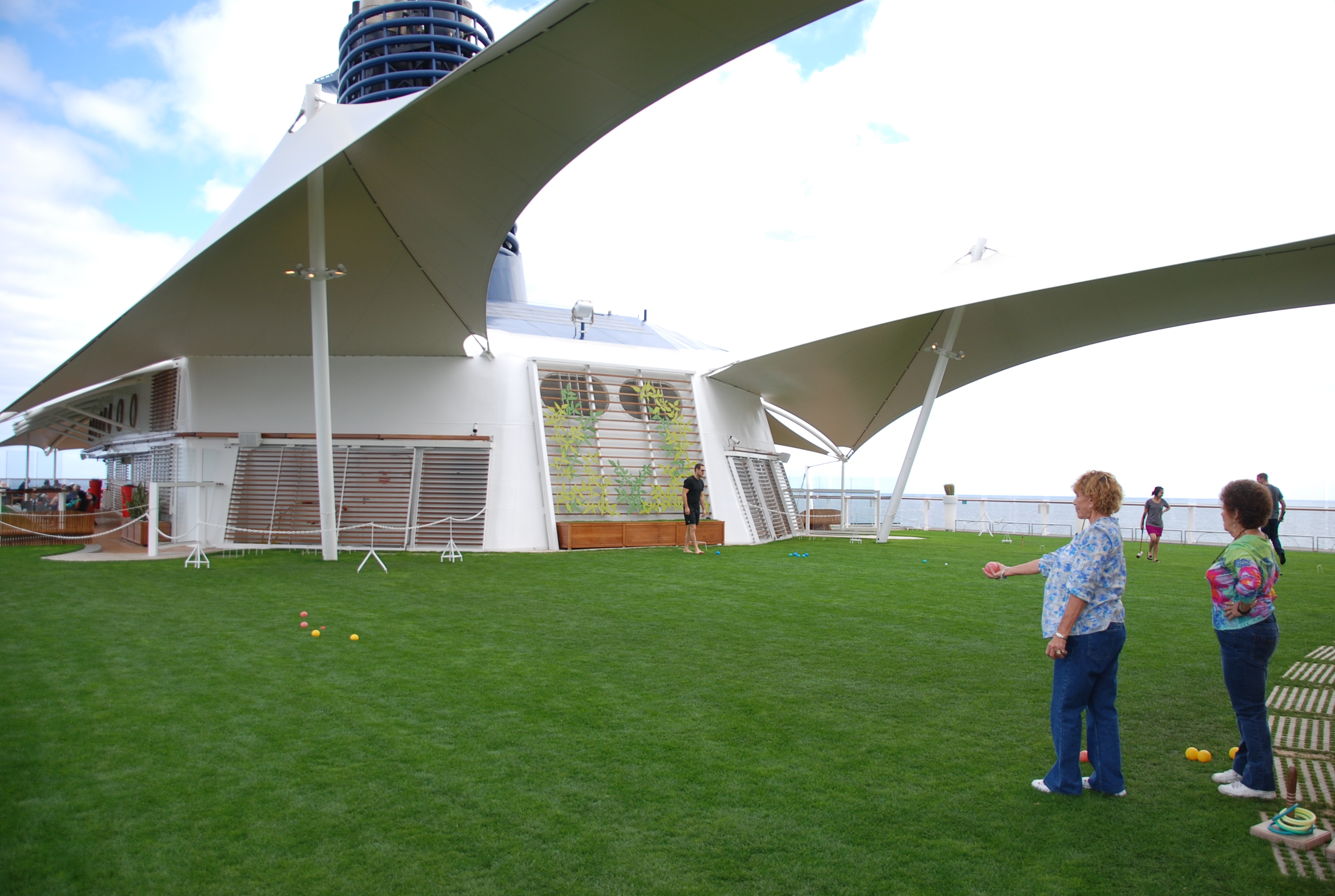
Lawn Club on the top deck

The vessel includes a theater and a lawn made up of real grass between the ship's funnels where croquet can be played.

Celebrity Equinox was refitted in May 2019.

== Itineraries ==
As of May 2026, the Celebrity Equinox sails to the Caribbean, Europe, South America, and Antarctica.

== Post Covid comeback ==
Celebriy Equinox sailed from Fort Lauderdale to the Caribbean on July 25, 2021, ending a year long halt in cruising.
