= Celebrity Silhouette =

Solstice-class cruise ship

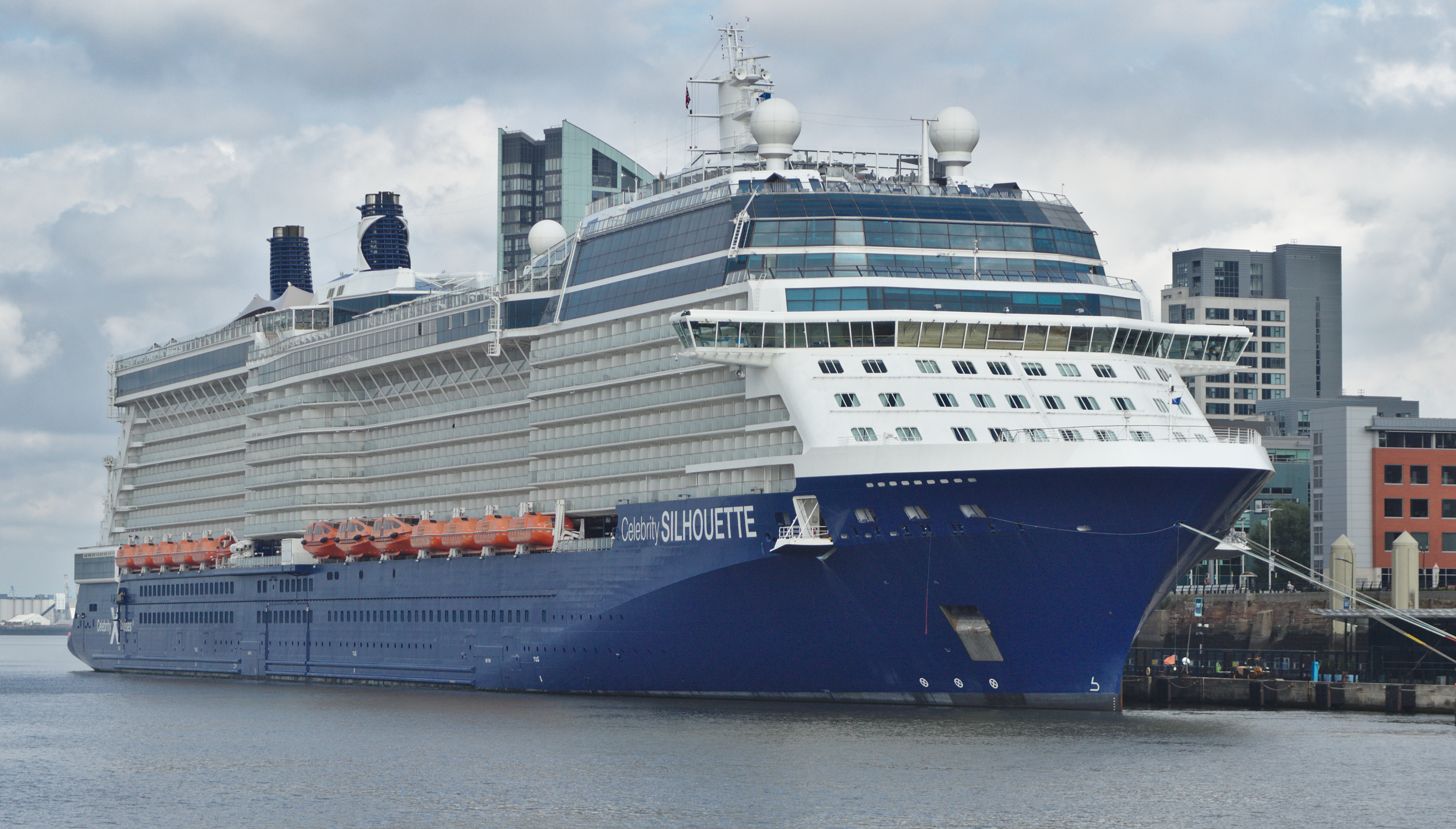
- Celebrity Silhouette in Liverpool, 2021

History

Malta
- Name: Celebrity Silhouette
- Owner: Royal Caribbean Group
- Operator: Celebrity Cruises
- Port of registry: Valletta, Malta
- Ordered: 18 May 2007
- Builder: Meyer Werft; Papenburg, Germany
- Yard number: S.679
- Launched: 29 May 2011
- Sponsored by: Michelle Morgan
- Christened: 21 July 2011
- Acquired: 18 July 2011
- Maiden voyage: 23 July 2011
- In service: 2011—present
- Identification: Call sign: 9HA2583; IMO number: 9451094; MMSI number: 248939000

General characteristics
- Class & type: Solstice-class cruise ship
- Tonnage: 122,210 GT
- Length: 319 m (1,046 ft 7 in) (length overall)
- Beam: 36.9 m (121 ft 1 in)
- Draught: 8.3 m (27 ft 3 in)
- Speed: 24 knots (44 km/h; 28 mph)
- Capacity: 2,886 passengers
- Crew: 1,500

Celebrity Silhouette is a Solstice-class cruise ship operated by Celebrity Cruises, a subsidiary of Royal Caribbean Group. She was ordered by German shipbuilder Meyer Werft in May 2007 and was delivered in July 2011 as the fourth Solstice-class ship in the fleet.

== Design ==
Celebrity Silhouette is built to the same design as her preceding three Solstice-class sister ships (Solstice, Equinox, and Eclipse), but measures approximately 400 tons larger and six feet longer. The 122,210 GT vessel is 319 metres (1,046 ft 7 in) in length overall and has a beam of 36.8 metres (120 ft 9 in). Upon completion, she had a capacity of 2,885 passengers. The ship recently went under refurbishment in 2020 following her sister ships.

== Construction ==
In May 2007, Celebrity Cruises announced it had ordered its fourth Solstice-class ship with German shipbuilder Meyer Werft for a tentative fall 2011 debut. The ship was estimated to cost around US$250,000 per berth, or roughly US$712.5 million. The vessel's name, Celebrity Silhouette, was announced on 21 December 2009. The ship left the drydock for the first time in January 2011, but later returned to drydock. On 29 May 2011, the ship was floated out from the Meyer Werft shipyard in Papenburg, and was delivered to Celebrity Cruises on 18 July 2011. She sailed to Hamburg for her naming ceremony on 21 July 2011, where Michelle Morgan, president and CEO of Signature Travel Network, christened the vessel.

== Service history ==
On 23 July 2011, Celebrity Silhouette embarked on her maiden voyage to Civitavecchia, where she operated Mediterranean voyages for her maiden summer season. She moved in fall 2011 to the Cape Liberty Cruise Port in Bayonne, New Jersey, where she operated 12-night Caribbean itineraries to complete her inaugural year.

Celebrity Silhouette has since been homeported at Port Everglades in Fort Lauderdale, Florida during the winters, sailing a variety of Caribbean itineraries, and has been deployed to Southampton in the summers for sailings around Northern Europe and the Mediterranean.

In November 2023, an onboard youth counselor admitted to the FBI to that he sexually abused multiple children aboard the ship. He was charged in federal court for abusive sexual contact with a minor.

== Gallery ==
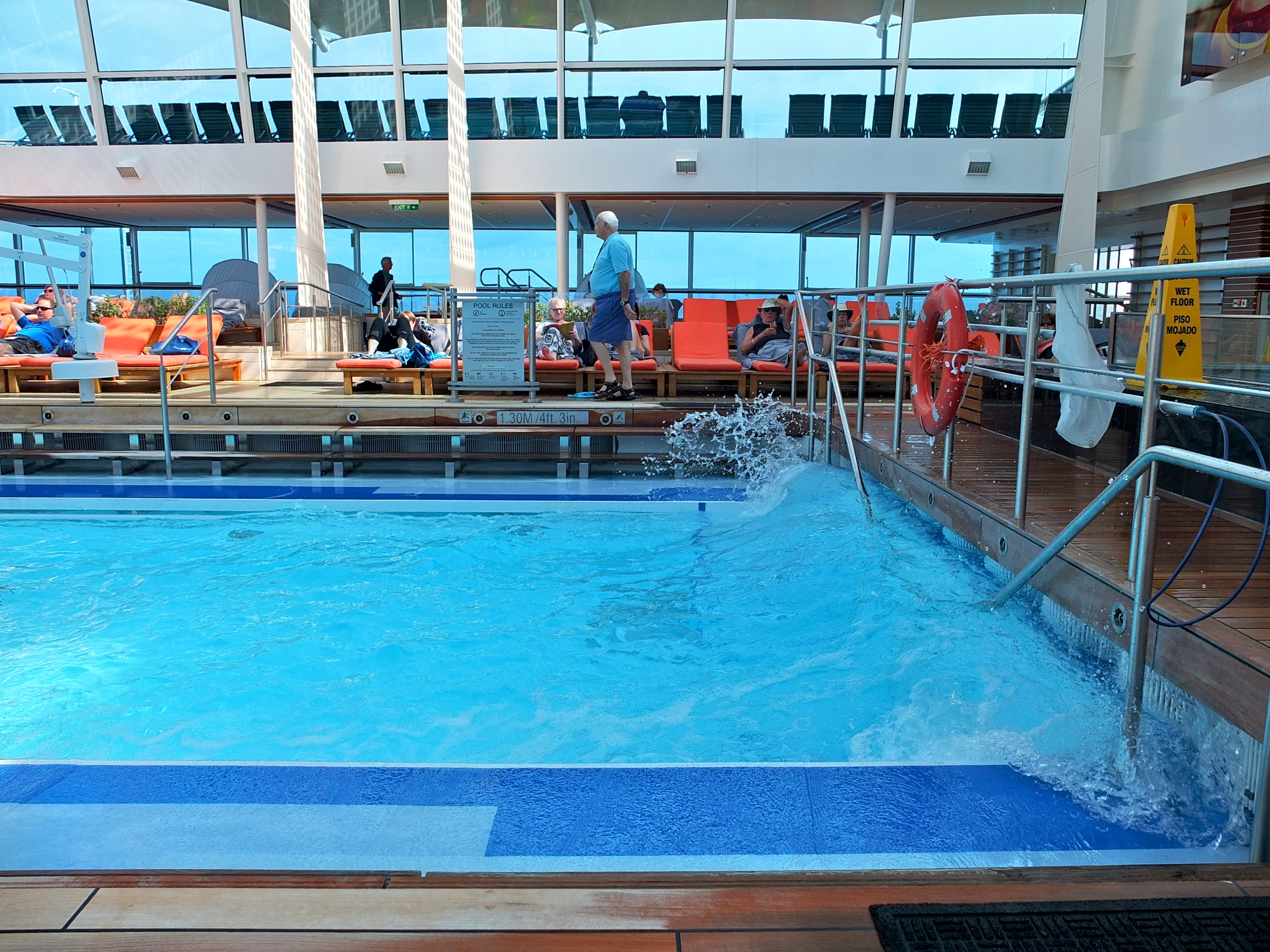
Solarium indoor pool

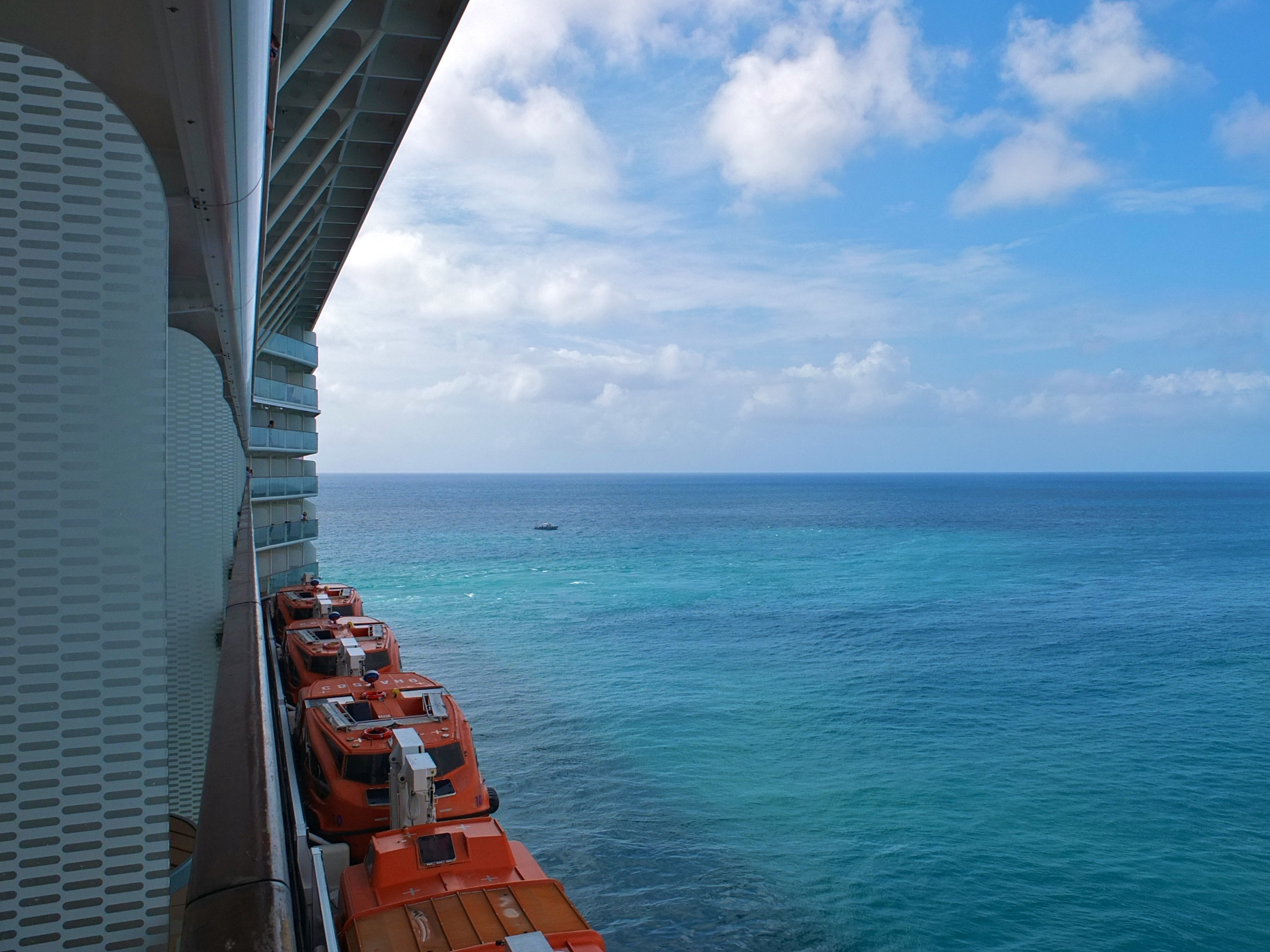
Balcony view looking aft from the port side of deck 8

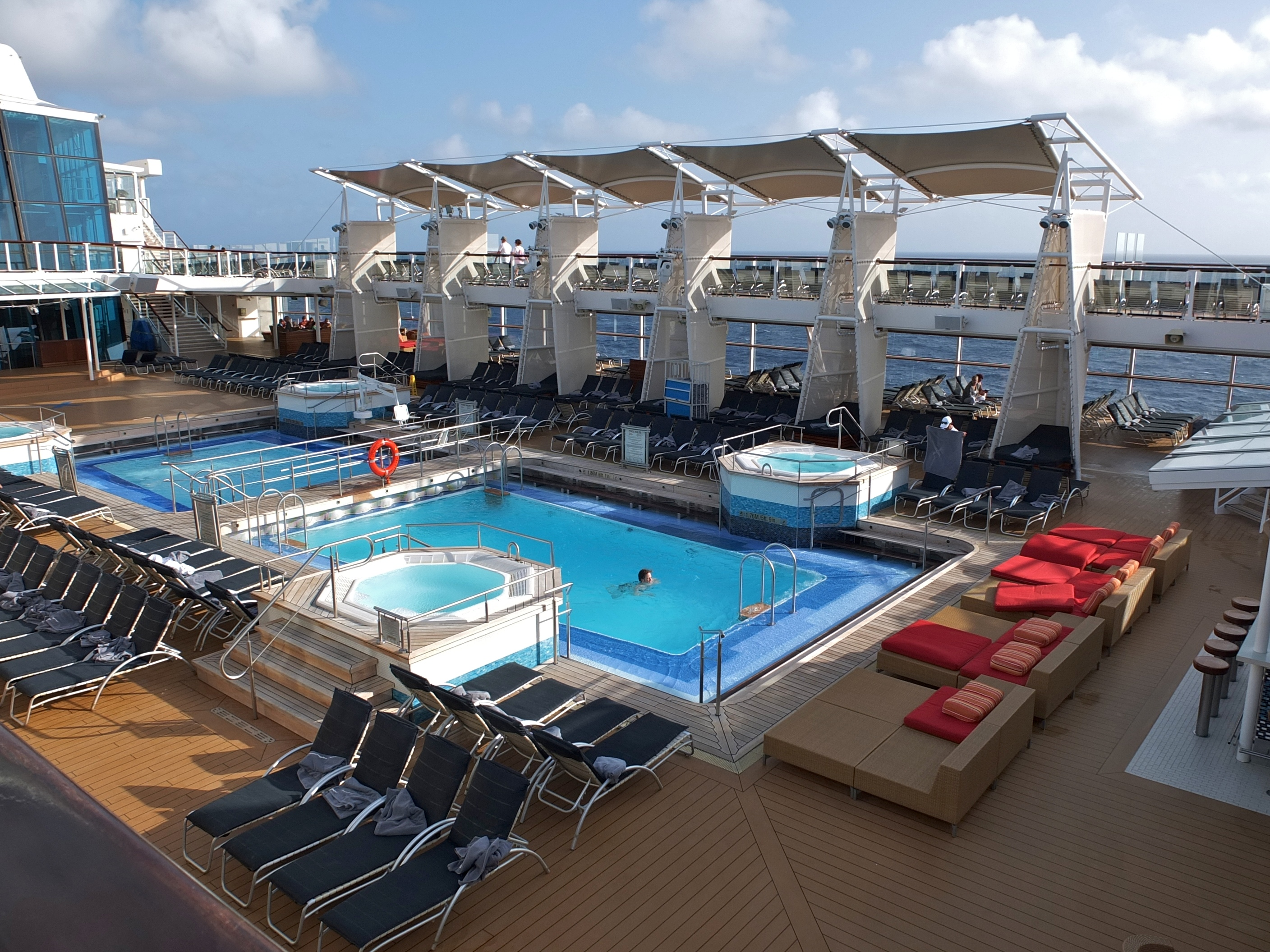
Swimming pools on deck 12
