= Sharon L. Smith =

American marine ecologist

Sharon Louise Smith is an American marine ecologist known for her work on zooplankton and their ability to respond to climate change. Smith was Professor Emeritus at the Rosenstiel School of Marine, Atmospheric, and Earth Science at the University of Miami.

== Education ==
Smith obtained a B.A. in biology from Colorado College in 1967, followed by a M.S. in zoology from University of Auckland in 1969, and a Ph.D. in Zoology from Duke University in 1975.

== Career ==
Smith became interested in ocean science as a 10 year old sailing with her parents on a freighter traveling from New York to Buenos Aires. When she started college, she had plans to be a doctor but changed to zoology after concluding that she was not cut out to be a medical doctor. Following graduate work at Duke, Smith did post-doctoral research at Dalhousie University in Nova Scotia and then spent more than a decade at Brookhaven National Laboratory. While at Brookhaven, Smith investigated the Somali Current during the monsoon season with multiple research cruises in the 1970s.

In 1993, Smith moved to the University of Miami's Rosenstiel School of Marine, Atmospheric, and Earth Science, where she later became the Dean of the Undergraduate Program in Marine Science.

Smith's research into the ecology of zooplankton and nutrient cycling started with her Ph.D. research which concluded that while zooplankton excreted ammonia and urea in a coastal estuary, zooplankton were not the main source of regenerated nitrogen. In the Greenland Sea, Smith examined the dynamics of nutrient cycling by zooplankton and the phytoplankton prey and egg production by copepods.

Smith has been involved in multiple research projects in the Arabian Sea. With funding from the National Science Foundation starting in 1994, she was the lead investigator for the management of the United States component of the Joint Global Ocean Flux Study (JGOFS) Arabian Sea Process Study. At the end of the JGOFS Arabian Sea program, Smith reflected upon the key results of the program including carbon cycling in the region, the possibility that the region is a natural iron enrichment experiment, and how the paleoceanographic data from the region may allow predictions about marine ecosystems' response to climate change. In 2006, Smith received a Fulbright Scholar Award to conduct additional research in the Arabian Sea and teach at the Sultan Qaboos University in Muscat, Oman. While in Oman, Smith examined the shifts in the copepod community during the changing Southwest Monsoon and concluded that the copepods were adapting to the strength of upwelling by altering their reproductive strategy. During this project Smith jointly published two books on the taxonomy of copepods in the region which were the first peer-reviewed taxonomic information on zooplankton in the Arabian Sea.

In the Arctic, Smith has worked on how global warming and changes in sea ice will alter the availability of food for small organisms. In 2004, Smith was part of a team who observed walrus pups abandoned offshore by their mothers who likely left to follow retreating sea ice, research that was covered in the local Ketchikan, Alaska newspaper and national press. Smith serves on the Science Steering Committee for the Bering Ecosystem Science section of the Arctic Research Consortium of the United States (ARCUS). Smith had been nominated to join the Arctic Research Commission, but when she noted that she was not a fan of George Bush's approach to economic and foreign policies, the interview process was stopped.

In 2008, Smith was named the sponsor for the Celebrity Solstice a cruise ship run by Celebrity Cruises which makes her the first ocean scientist to serve as a ship's sponsor. During the ceremony launching the ship Smith, a two-time cancer survivor, encouraged people to "be [their] own best advocate and insist on what's right for you" when advocating for regular cancer screenings.

== Awards ==
- American Geophysical Union Fellow (2004)
