= Maersk Cape Coast =

Container ship operated by Maersk Line

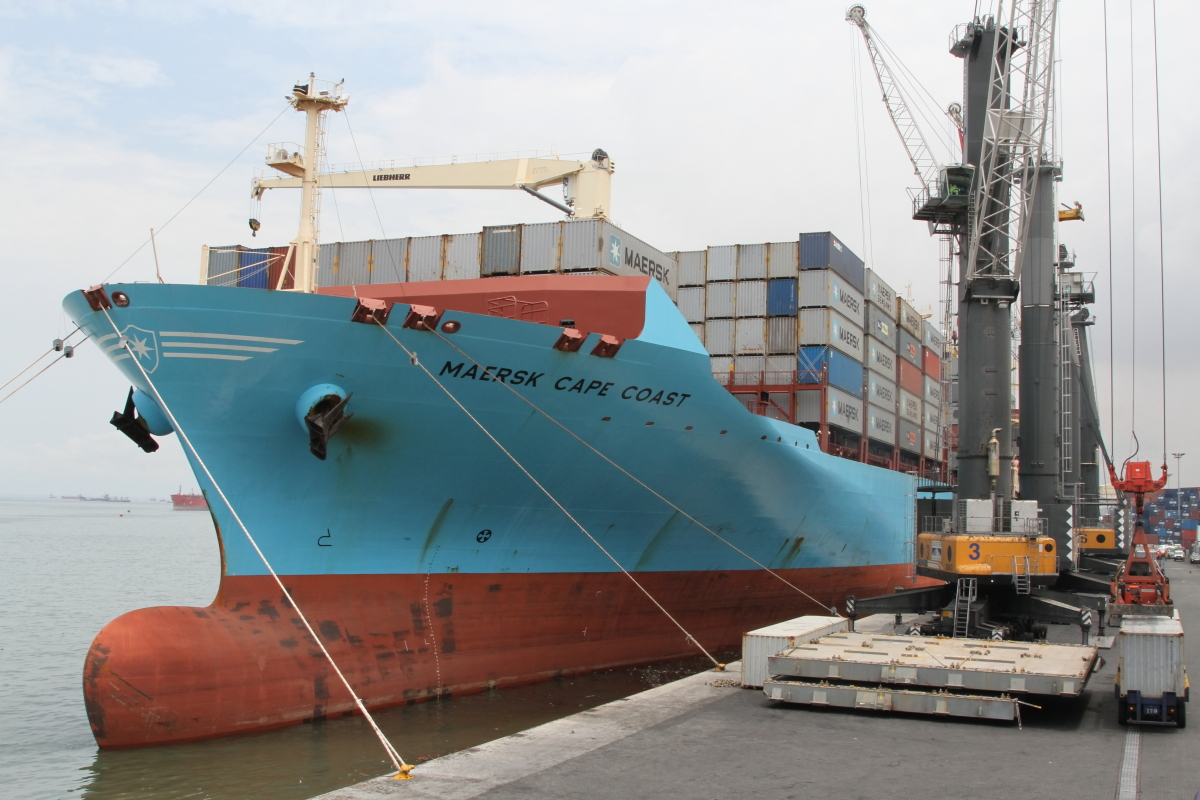
- Maersk Cape Coast is moored at Luanda, Angola while unloading containers.

History
- Name: Maersk Cape Coast
- Owner: Maersk Line
- Operator: Maersk Line
- Port of registry: Singapore
- Route: West Africa
- Builder: Hyundai Heavy Industries Co. Ltd.
- Yard number: 2341
- Launched: 1 April 2011
- Completed: 2011
- Acquired: 2011
- Identification: IMO number: 9525314; Call sign: 9V9407
- Status: In active service

General characteristics
- Class & type: ABS
- Type: Container vessel
- Tonnage: 50,869 GT
- Length: 249.12 m (817 ft 4 in)
- Beam: 37.40 m (122 ft 8 in)
- Draught: 12.50 m (41 ft 0 in)
- Installed power: 23,880 kW (32,020 hp)
- Capacity: 4,496 TEU
- Crew: 20

Maersk Cape Coast is a container ship operated by Maersk Line, which measures 50,869 gross tons. It is named Cape Coast after the capital of Central Region, Ghana. The ship was named in Tema Harbour by Ernestina Naadu Mills, the former first lady of Ghana on 18 July 2011. The container ship is one of Maersk Line's fleet of vessels that ply the West Africa sector.

== Ship construction and description ==
The vessel was built in Ulsan, South Korea by Hyundai Heavy Industries. The overall length of the vessel is 249.12 meters (817 ft 4 in) with a beam of 37.40 m (122 ft 8 in). The vessel has a carrying capacity of 4,496 twenty-foot units of containers, including reefers and dry types. The vessel is fitted with a waste and heat recovery system, which can save ten percent of engine power. As most ports in the West Africa sector are not equipped with container cranes, the vessel is equipped with four stationary cranes.
