= ND Ilhéu da Mina =

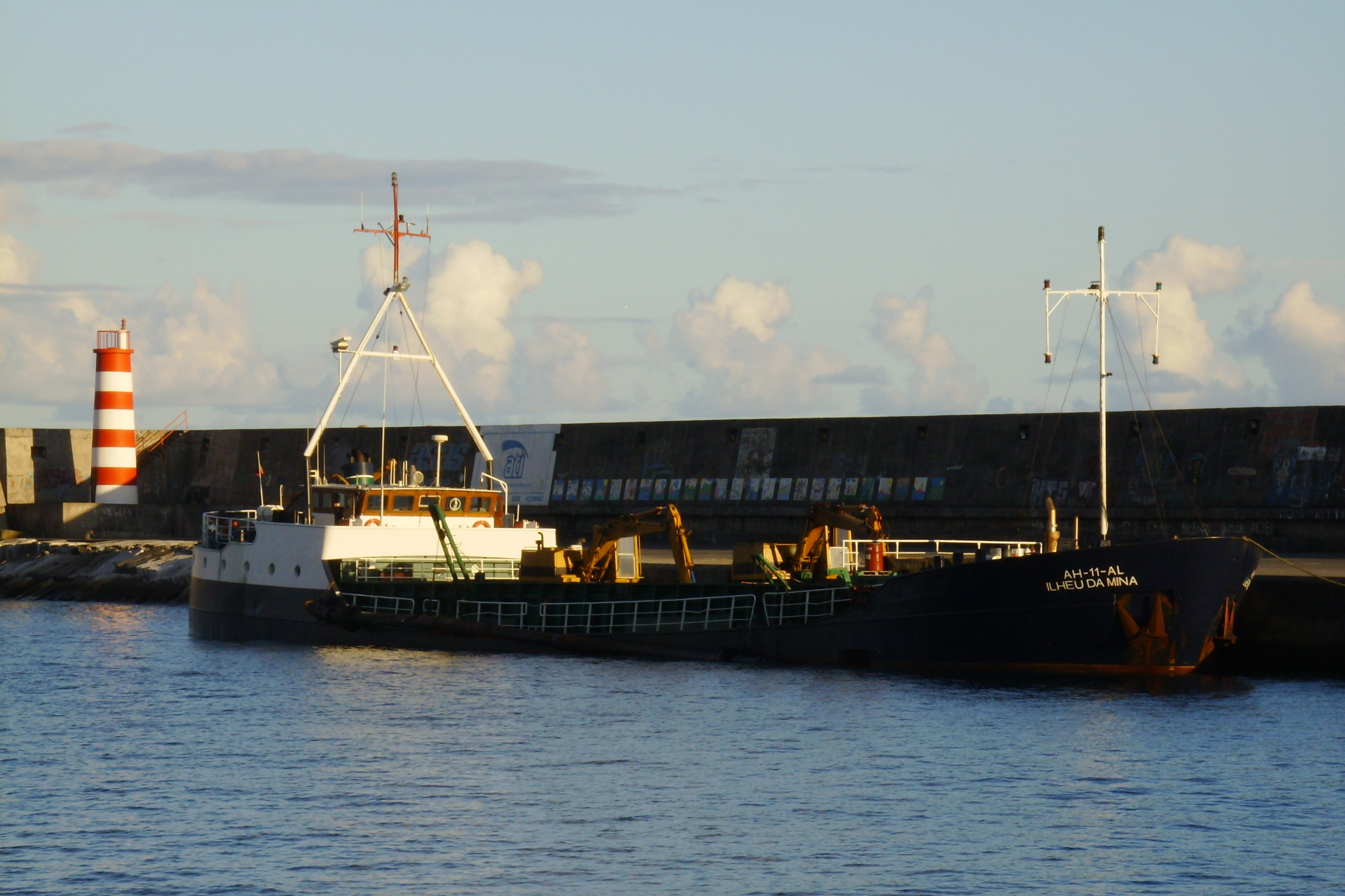
- The ND Ilhéu da Mina at the port of Vila do Porto on the island of Santa Maria

History
- Name: ND Ilhéu da Mina
- Operator: Açores Madeira - Sociedade de Extração e Comercialização de Areia dos Açores, Lda.
- Port of registry: Portugal Angra do Heroísmo
- Builder: Buijs Scheepsbouw, Krimpen aan den IJssel
- Launched: 20 December 1976
- In service: 16 August 2004
- Identification: IMO number: 7533288
- Status: Active

General characteristics
- Tonnage: 906 tonnes (906 t)
- Crew: 5

The ND Ilhéu da Mina is a dredger and freighter operated by Açores Madeira that operates in the archipelago of the Azores.

== History ==
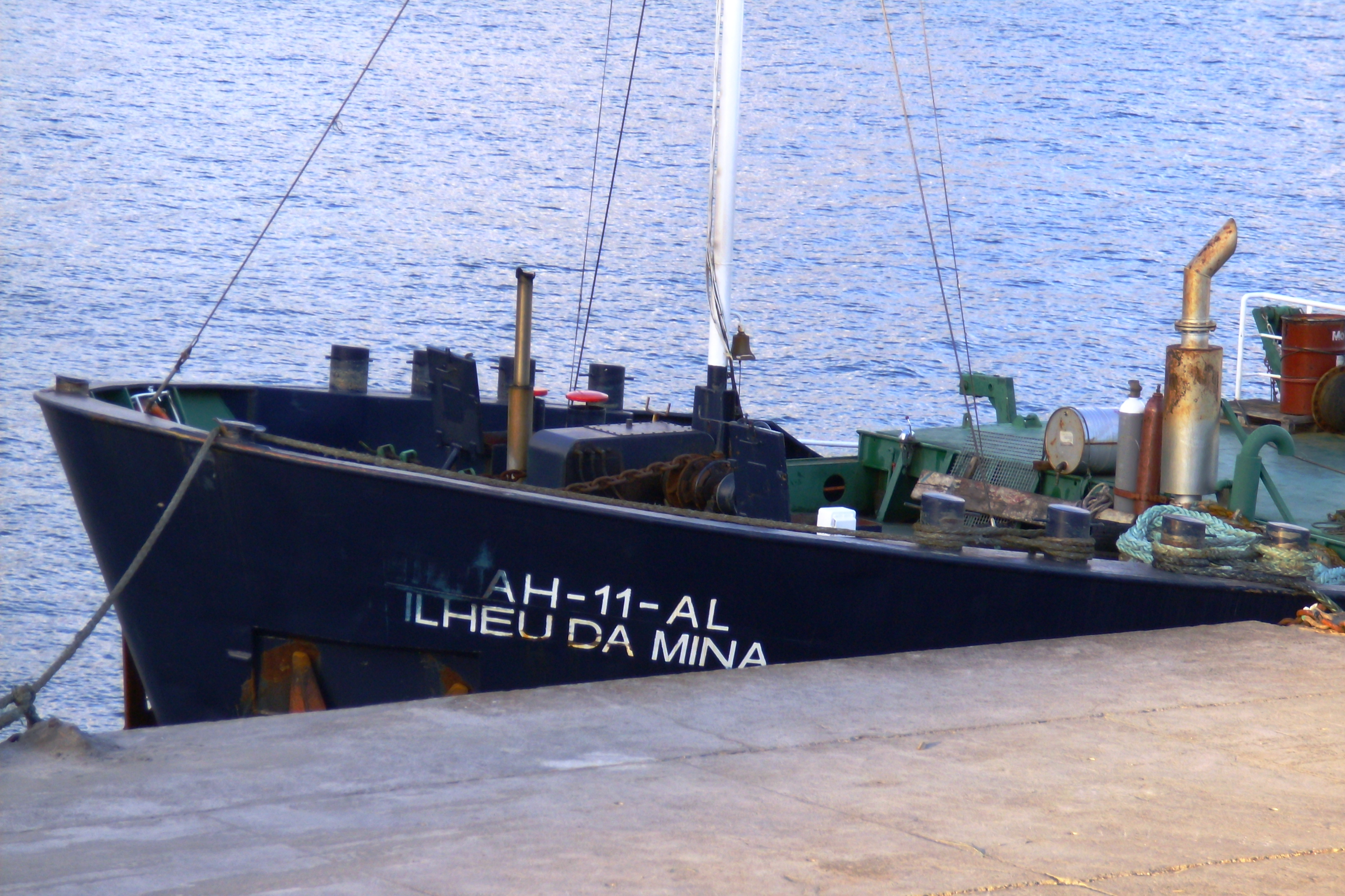
A detail of the freighter ND Ilhéu da Mina in Santa Maria

The ship was launched on 20 December 1976 by the Dutch shipyards of Buijs Scheepsbouw, Krimpen aan den IJssel, and baptized Riosal.

It was sold various times throughout its history; on 20 January 1983 it was renamed River Herald, on 31 March 1988, Espero I, on 21 June 1989, Sandettie, on 19 March 1993, Sirenitas and on 24 January 2002, Ilheu Damina.

On 16 August 2004 it was rechristened the Ilhéu da Mina, after it was acquired by the maritime operator Açores Madeira - Sociedade de Extração e Comercialização de Areia dos Açores, Lda. It frequently operates in the service for the Secretaria Regional do Ambiente e do Mar (Regional Secretariat for Environment and Sea), transporting sand among the islands.
