= Star-class container ship =

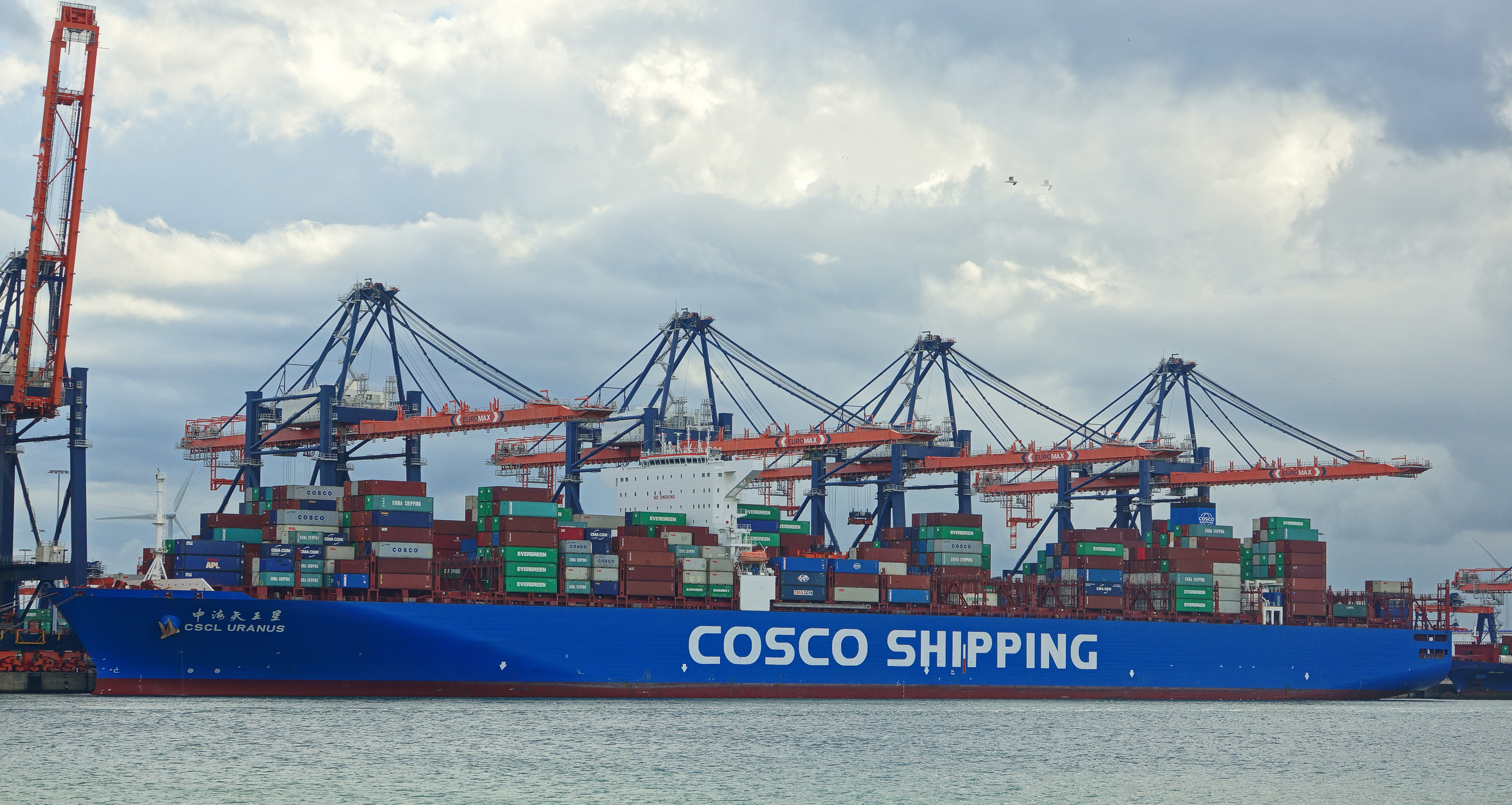
- CSCL Uranus in the port of Rotterdam

Class overview
- Builders: Samsung Heavy Industries
- Operators: COSCO SHIPPING Lines
- In service: 2011-present
- Completed: 8
- Active: 8

General characteristics
- Type: Container ship
- Tonnage: 151,993 GT
- Length: 366.07 m (1,201 ft)
- Beam: 51.2 m (168 ft)
- Draught: 15.5 m (51 ft)
- Propulsion: MAN B&W 12K98ME-C
- Capacity: 14,074 TEU

The Star class is a series of 8 container ships built for China Shipping Container Lines and currently operated by COSCO SHIPPING Lines. The ships have a maximum theoretical capacity of 14,074 TEU. The ships were built by Samsung Heavy Industries in South Korea.

== List of ships ==
Ship	Yard number	IMO number	Delivery	Status	ref
CSCL Star	1819	9466867	15 Jan 2011	In service	
CSCL Venus	1820	9467251	29 Apr 2011	In service	
CSCL Jupiter	1821	9467263	20 May 2011	In service	
CSCL Mercury	1822	9467275	13 Jul 2011	In service	
CSCL Mars	1823	9467287	28 Oct 2011	In service	
CSCL Saturn	1824	9467339	21 Dec 2011	In service	
CSCL Uranus	1825	9467304	9 Mar 2012	In service	
CSCL Neptune	1826	9467316	22 May 2012	In service	

== See also ==
- Globe-class container ship
