= Solstice-class cruise ship =

Cruise ships operated by Celebrity Cruises

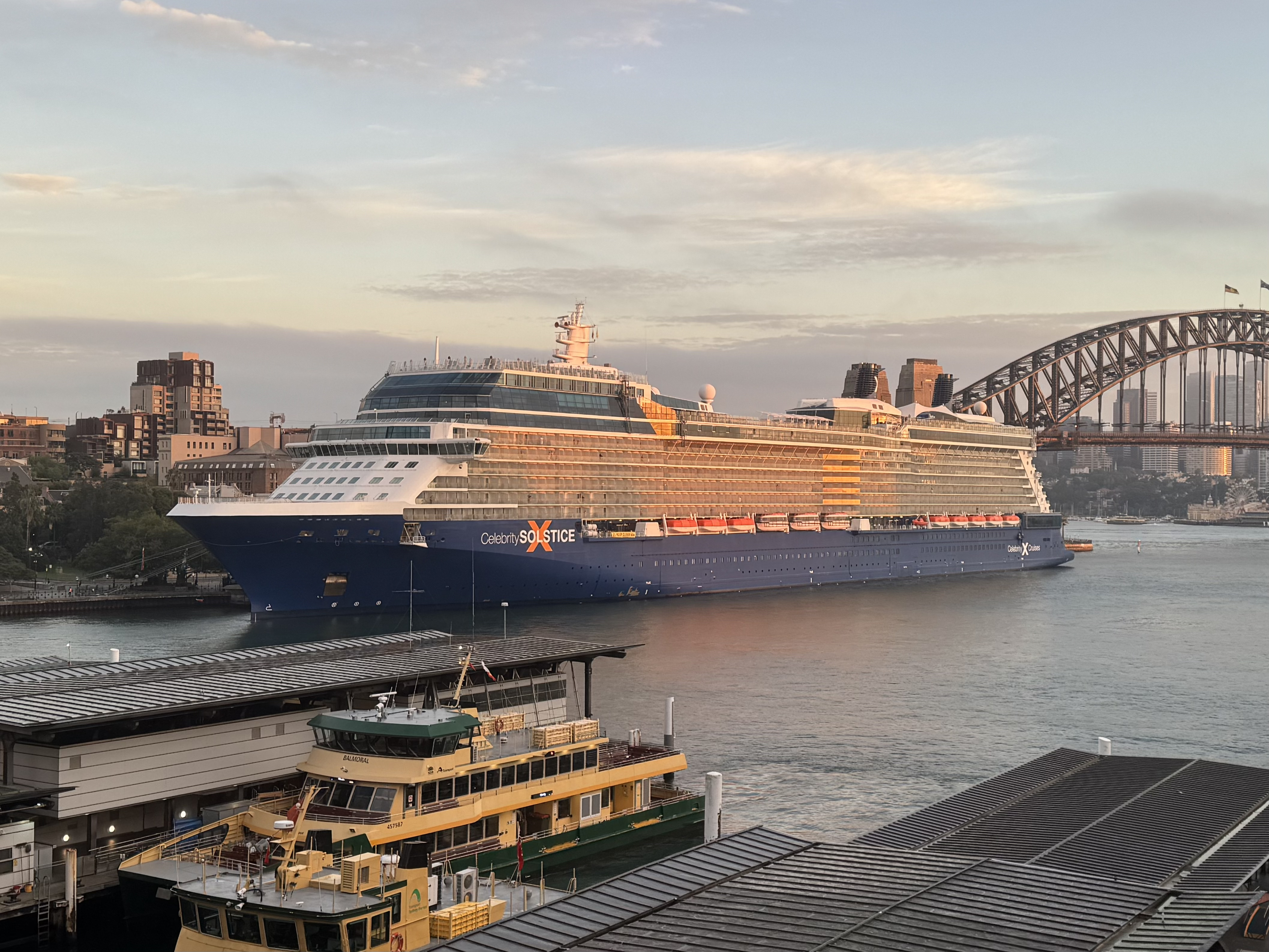
- The lead ship, Celebrity Solstice in Sydney, Australia

Class overview
- Name: Solstice
- Builders: Meyer Werft
- Operators: Celebrity Cruises
- Preceded by: Millennium class
- Succeeded by: Edge class
- Built: 2007–2012
- In service: 2008–present
- Planned: 5
- Completed: 5
- Active: 5

General characteristics
- Type: Cruise ship
- Tonnage: 122,000 GT
- Length: 317.20 m (1,040 ft 8 in) (LOA)
- Beam: 36.8 m (120 ft 9 in)
- Draught: 8.5 m (27 ft 11 in)
- Decks: 17 decks
- Installed power: 67,200 kW (90,100 hp)
- Propulsion: 41,000 kW (55,000 hp)
- Speed: 24 knots (44 km/h; 28 mph)
- Capacity: 2,850 passengers
- Crew: 1,500
- Notes: post-Panamax ships

The Solstice class is a class of cruise ships operated by Celebrity Cruises, a subsidiary of Royal Caribbean Cruises Ltd. The class is constructed by Meyer Werft of Germany. At present, there are five active Solstice-class ships: the lead vessel of the class, Celebrity Solstice; the second ship of the class, Celebrity Equinox; and the third ship of the class, Celebrity Eclipse, which was delivered on 15 April 2010. The fourth ship, Celebrity Silhouette, sailed on her maiden voyage on 23 July 2011; and the fifth, Celebrity Reflection, was launched in August 2012. The first Solstice-class ship, Celebrity Solstice entered service in November 2008 and is the namesake of the class. All Solstice-class vessels have post-Panamax dimensions.

Celebrity Solstice was, at 122,000 gross tonnage (GT), the largest ship to be built at a German shipyard, but this record was surpassed by the Disney Dream, a 128,000 GT cruise ship of the Disney Cruise Line.

== History ==
The first Solstice-class vessel was ordered in year 2005 at Meyer Werft, with one vessel as the first option. Later, option for second vessel was exercised. Meyer Werft reached several milestones in their career while building the Solstice class. It was their first time to build 122,000 GT cruise ships having post-Panamax dimensions. By that time, the class were the largest cruise ships ever built at the facility. On February and July 2006, the second and the third vessel was ordered respectively. The order for the fourth and fifth ship followed in 2007 and 2008. The class consists of five ships, with expected delivery of one ship each year, from 2008 to 2012, at a total cost of US$3.7 billion.

=== Concept and construction ===
The keel of Celebrity Solstice was laid on 11 October 2006, and was delivered on 24 October 2008. The keel of Celebrity Equinox was laid on 6 August 2008 and delivered on 16 July 2009. The keel of Celebrity Eclipse was laid on 23 January 2009 and was delivered on 15 April 2010. The fourth ship, Celebrity Silhouette was delivered on 18 July 2011 and the fifth and final ship, Celebrity Reflection was handed over on 9 October 2012.

== Design features ==
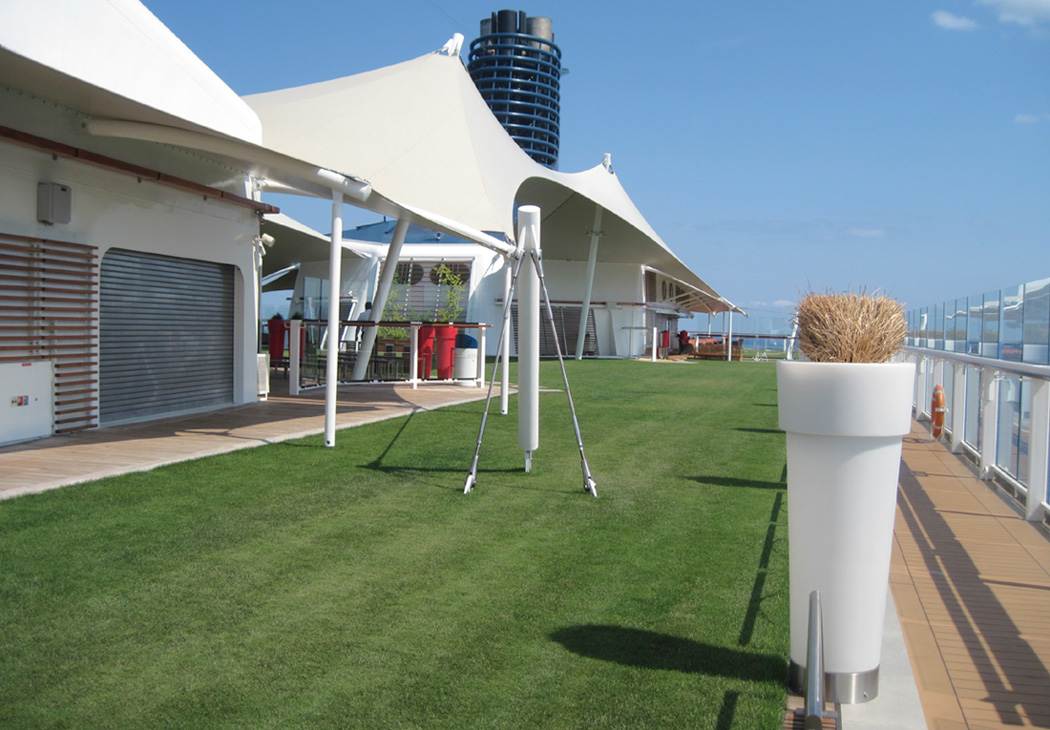
Lawn Club

The Solstice class was designed by a team of architects. The overall masterplan was completed by Boston-based Wilson Butler Architects, who would also design the entertainment venues such as the Main Theater, Grand Foyer, and open decks, including the Lawn Club. Located on deck 15 is a one-half-acre (2,000 m^{2}), manicured lawn. A special type of grass, Agrostis stolonifera, is used for the lawn. The areas such as Patio on the Lawn, Sunset Bar, Lawn Club Shop and The Hot Glass Show are found on the lawn.

Other designers included, Tihany Design, who designed the interior of the main dining room; BG Studio, who designed Cellar masters, Passport Bar, Ensemble Lounge, Micheals Club, and Murano; 5 + Design, Galleria Boutique, Fortune Casino, Art Gallery; and RTKL, who designed the spa.

The staterooms on Solstice-class ships are significantly larger than the previous classes, with 80% having a veranda. The staterooms are grouped into seven categories; including the spa-inspired AquaClass and the Concierge class. There are two penthouse suites, a 110 m^{2} (1,200 sq ft) stateroom and several royal suites, a 54 m^{2} (580 sq ft) stateroom. Both have a living room, dining room and separate bedrooms. There are also Jacuzzis and separate showers. The Solstice class feature amenities such as large staterooms, a large theater, and multiple dining options. Signature Celebrity features were also added, such as the Martini Bar. The newest feature of the class is the iLounge, a combination of Internet café and an Apple authorized resale store. This feature was added to Celebrity Eclipse and Celebrity Silhouette, and on Celebrity Solstice in May 2010.

=== Exterior design ===
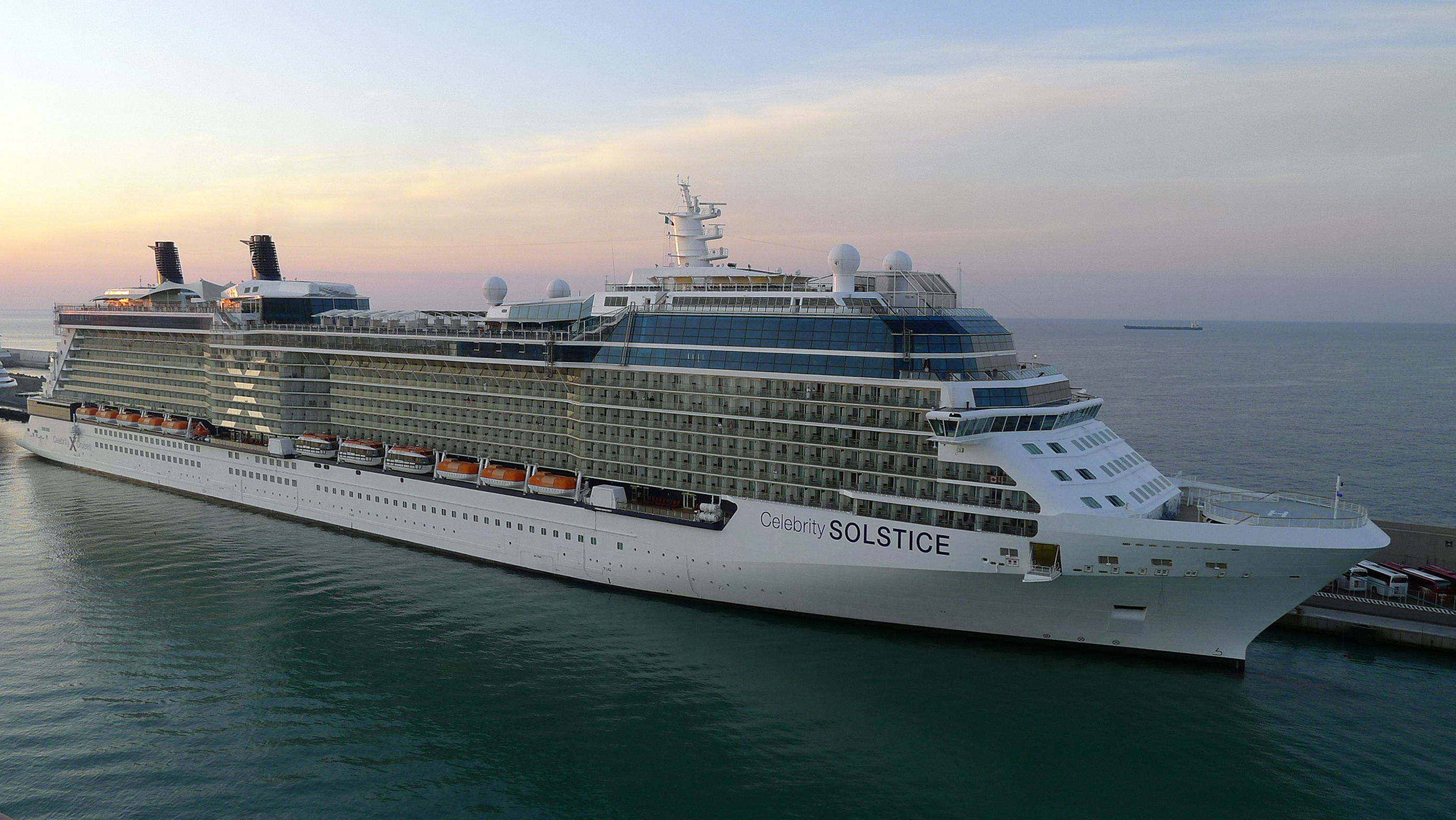
Celebrity Solstice exterior design by Martin Francis

The Solstice class exterior styling was by yacht designer Martin Francis. The original renderings for the Solstice class was to have powder blue upper decks and funnels. Because Celebrity uses dark blue as a trademark on their ships, the powder blue was subsequently changed to dark blue. The lead vessel, Celebrity Solstice, carries the original concept and design for the class, such as twin funnels with a small "X" on the front funnel and a large "X" on the railings of the hump staterooms. Several months after her service, the "X" logo on the railings were seen by Celebrity as a design flaw. Due to this, the "X" logo on the railings was removed from Celebrity Equinox and Celebrity Eclipse and from future Solstice-class ships. In order to compensate, the small "X" on the front funnel was enlarged on ships following Celebrity Solstice.

== Ship facts ==
- Gross tonnage: 122,000 GT
- Length: 1,033 feet (314.86 m)
- Width: 121 feet (36.88 m)
- Cost: $750 million

== Ships ==
| Ship | Entered service for Celebrity | Capacity | Gross tonnage | Flag | Notes | Image |
|---|---|---|---|---|---|---|
| Celebrity Solstice | 2008 | 2,850 | 121,878 GT | Malta | Celebrity's biggest ship by introduction | |
| Celebrity Equinox | 2009 | 2,850 | 121,878 GT | Malta | | |
| Celebrity Eclipse | 2010 | 2,850 | 121,878 GT | Malta | | |
| Celebrity Silhouette | 2011 | 2,886 | 122,210 GT | Malta | | |
| Celebrity Reflection | 2012 | 3,046 | 125,366 GT | Malta | Celebrity's biggest cruise ship (by passenger count) before the introduction of Edge in 2018 (and subsequently Apex and Beyond) | |
