= Celebrity Eclipse =

Solstice-class cruise ship

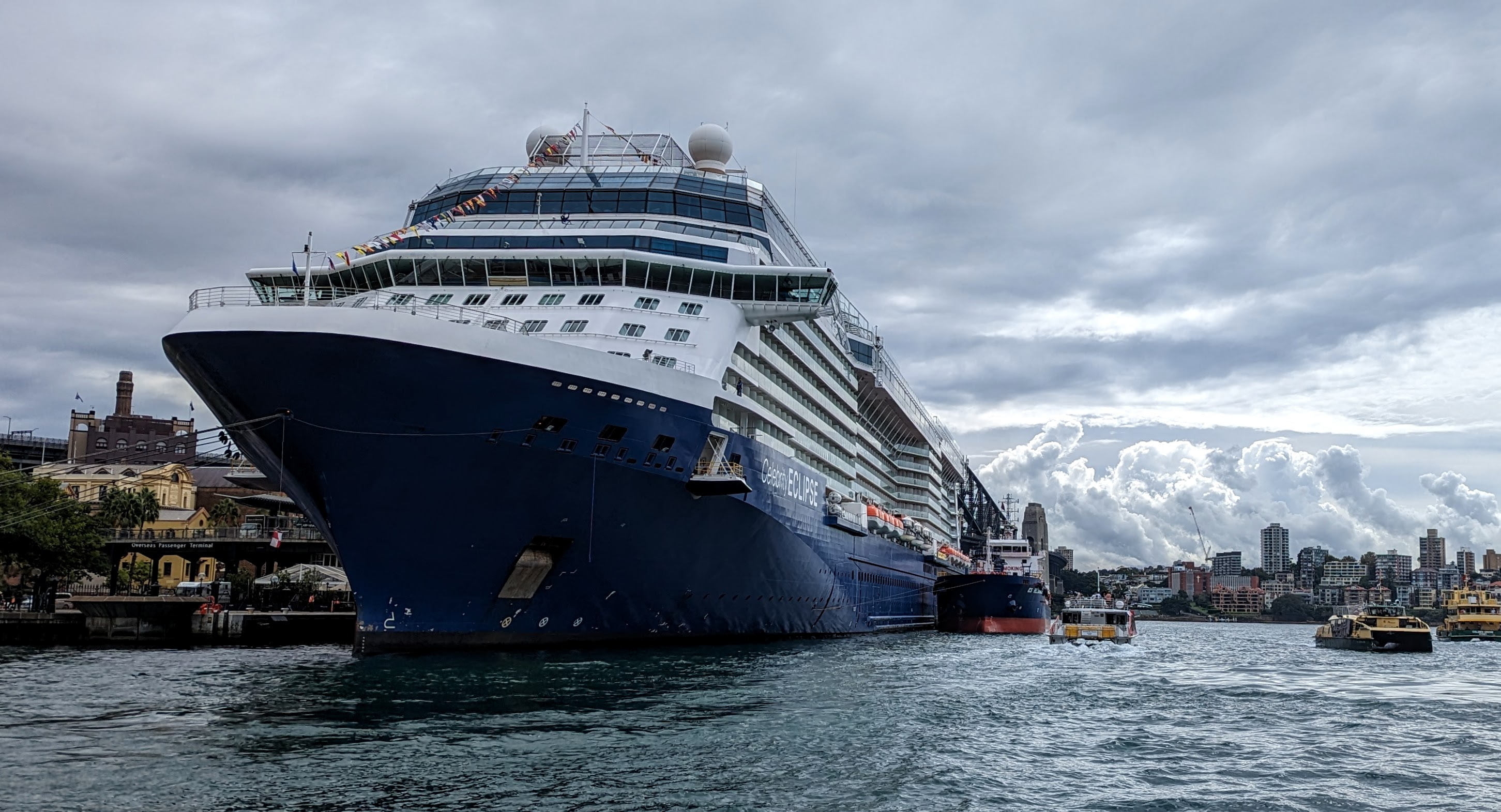
- Celebrity Eclipse in Sydney, 2023

History

Malta
- Name: Celebrity Eclipse
- Owner: Celebrity Eclipse Inc. (Royal Caribbean Group)
- Operator: Celebrity Cruises
- Port of registry: 2010–2010: Nassau, Bahamas, Bahamas; 2010–Present: Valletta, Malta
- Ordered: 14 July 2006
- Builder: Meyer Werft, Papenburg, Germany
- Cost: US$750 million
- Yard number: 677
- Laid down: 23 January 2009
- Launched: 28 February 2010
- Christened: 24 April 2010 at Southampton by Emma Pontin
- Acquired: 15 April 2010
- Maiden voyage: 29 April 2010
- Identification: Call sign: 9HXC9; IMO number: 9404314; MMSI number: 249666000; DNV ID: 27760
- Status: In service

General characteristics
- Class & type: Solstice-class cruise ship
- Tonnage: 121,878 GT
- Length: 317.14 m (1,040 ft 6 in)
- Beam: 36.80 m (120 ft 9 in)
- Draft: 8.30 m (27 ft 3 in)
- Decks: 17 decks
- Installed power: 4 × Wärtsilä 16V46; 67,200 kW (combined)
- Propulsion: Two ABB Azipods; Three Wärtsilä CT300 bow thrusters (3,000 kW each)
- Speed: 24 knots (44 km/h; 28 mph)
- Capacity: 2,850 passengers
- Crew: approx. 1,271

Celebrity Eclipse is a Solstice-class cruise ship operated by Celebrity Cruises, a subsidiary of Royal Caribbean Group. After she was ordered with German shipbuilder Meyer Werft in July 2006, she saw her keel laid in February 2007 and she was formally delivered in April 2010. The 122,000 GT-vessel followed sister ships Celebrity Solstice and Celebrity Equinox as the third Solstice-class ship in the fleet.

== Design and construction ==
The keel of Celebrity Eclipse was laid on 14 February 2007 and she was floated out of her drydock on 28 February 2010. The ship was delivered to Celebrity on 15 April 2010 in Eemshaven and was christened by British yachtswoman Emma Pontin on 24 April 2010.

Celebrity Eclipse is the third Solstice-class ship, preceded by Celebrity Solstice and Celebrity Equinox. Solstice-class ships were designed to save energy through their photovoltaic systems and an optimized hull design with efficient hull coatings and lighting systems using light-emitting diodes.

== Service history ==
=== 2010 Iceland volcanic eruption ===
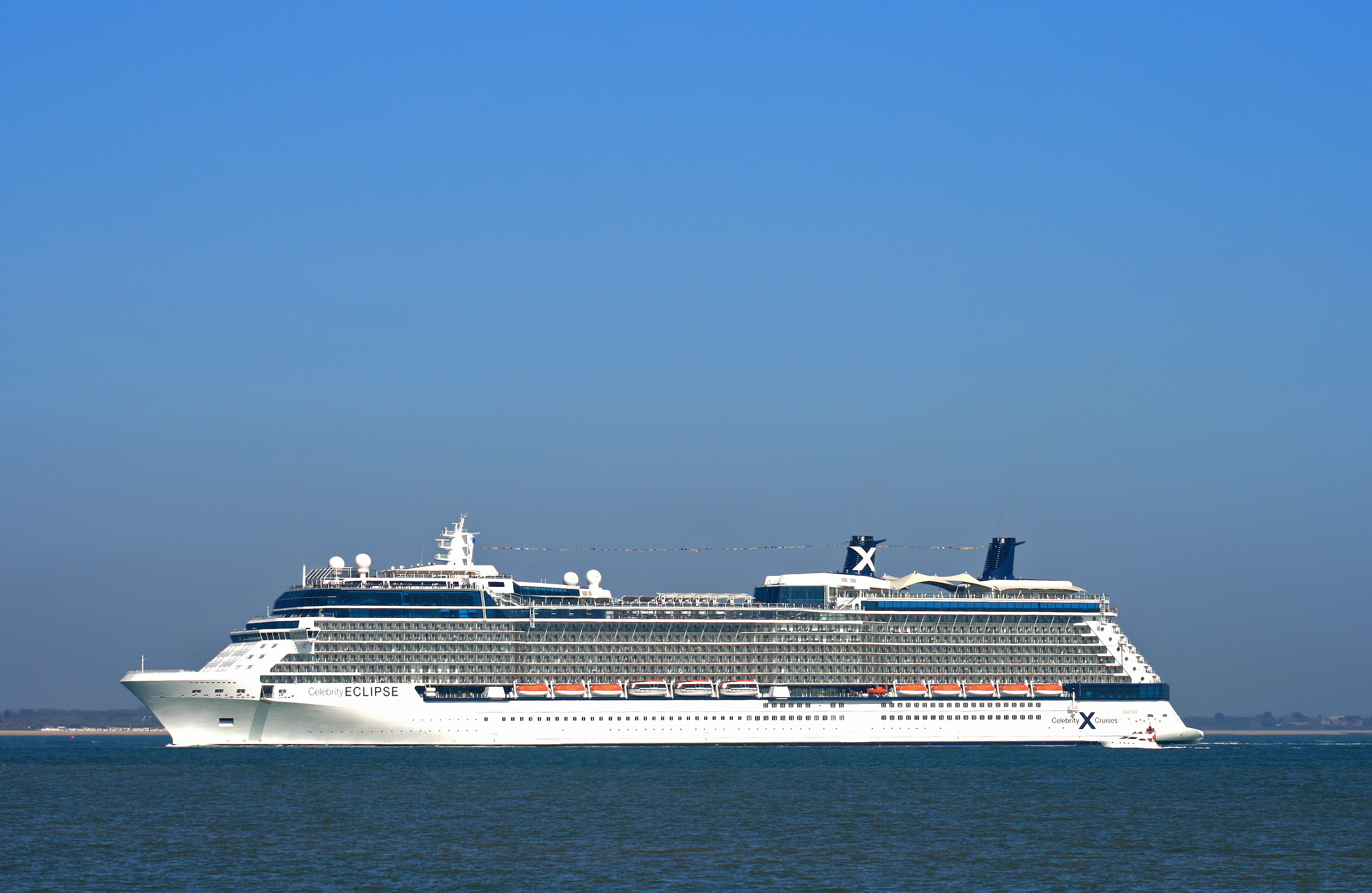
Celebrity Eclipse inbound to Southampton on 23 April 2010 with 2,200 British tourists stranded by the Eyjafjallajökull eruptions

In response to the 2010 shutdown of UK airspace due to the eruption of Iceland's Eyjafjallajökull volcano, the newly completed Celebrity Eclipse returned 2,000 British tourists stranded in Spain as "an act of goodwill" by the owners, sailing from Southampton to Bilbao on 21 April and returning on 23 April.

=== Allegations of poor working conditions ===
In October 2012 Channel 4 TV aired a Dispatches undercover documentary that exposed poor working conditions and exploitation of workers on Celebrity Eclipse. Allegations include flying under a flag of convenience to enable the ship owners to be unconstrained by employment legislation, including minimum wages and working hours. The documentary showed footage of workers who had no rest days in many months, and workers who had to pay helpers to enable them to fulfil their duties. Celebrity Cruises denied the allegations in the documentary.

=== COVID-19 pandemic ===
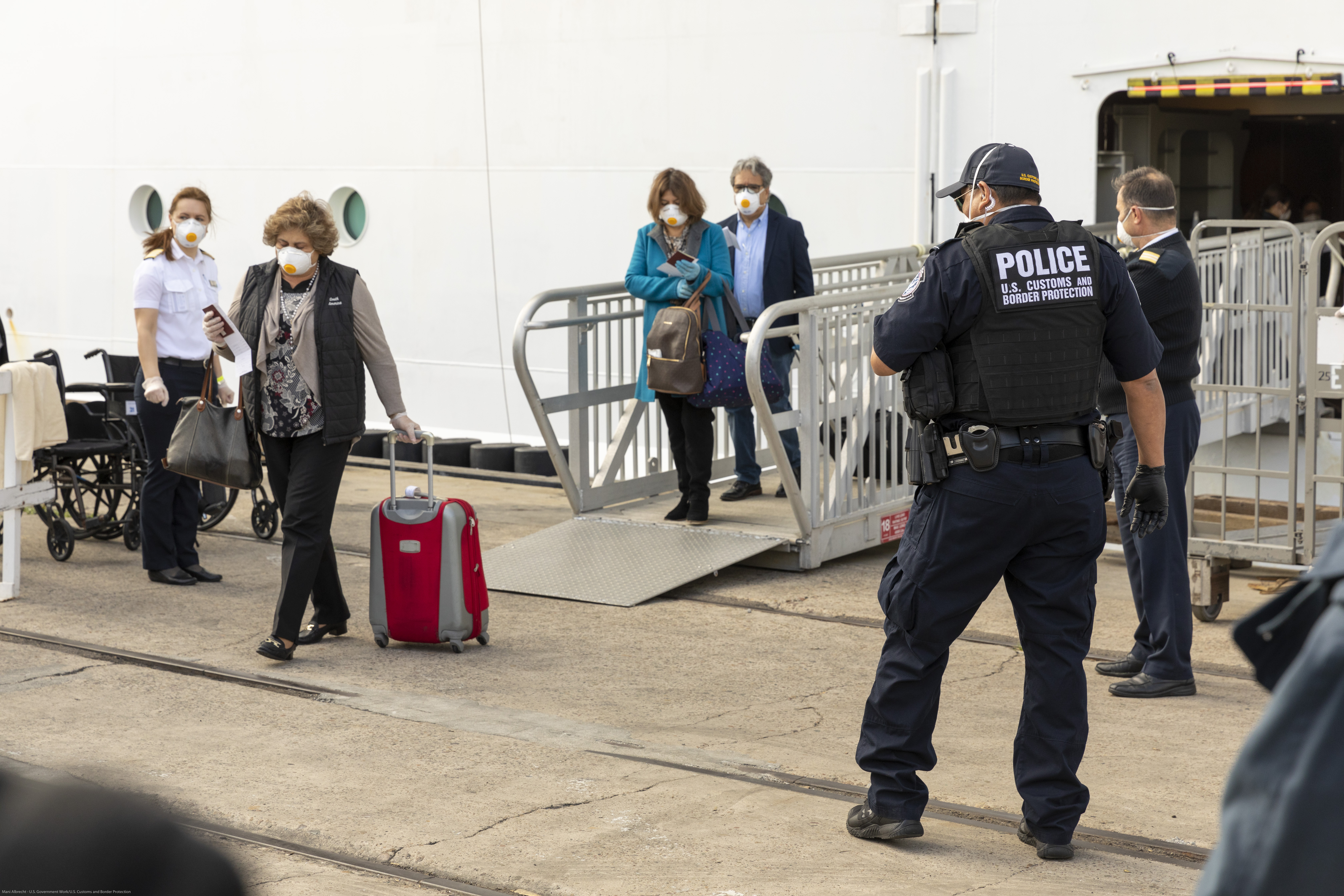
Celebrity Eclipse at the Port of San Diego disembarking her final passengers in April 2020 during the COVID-19 pandemic

Passengers began disembarking from the ship in San Diego on 30 March 2020 after her last sailing. In April, allegations surfaced that the ship had failed to protect passengers from known cases of COVID-19. Passengers and crew had tested positive despite Celebrity's original public denials of any cases on board. One man died in the United States four days after returning home in the United States and his wife also tested positive. Another passenger, an 83-year-old man, was reported dead in Queensland, Australia, on 18 April.

After disembarking the passengers the ship was placed under a no-sail order, effective through July, by the Centers for Disease Control. As of May 2020 Celebrity Eclipse and two other cruise ships were still at anchor offshore from San Diego. Approximately 700 crew were reportedly still aboard Celebrity Eclipse.
