= Crew boat =

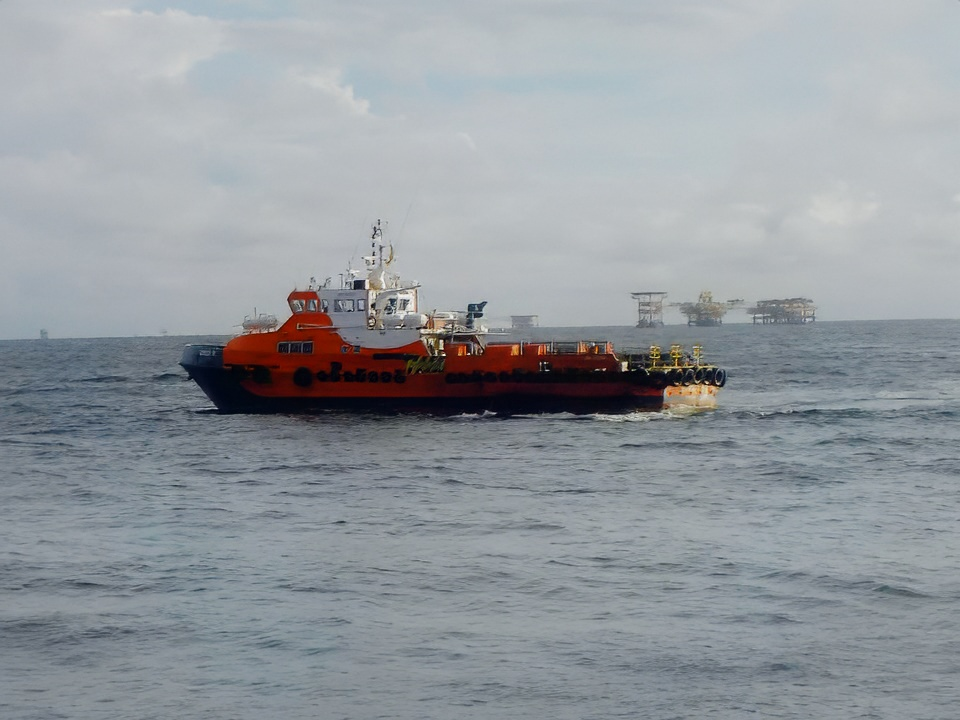
Crewboat off Brunei

A crew boat, also called a crewboat, crew transfer vessel (CTV), fast support vessel, fast supply vessel or fast intervention supply vessel, is a vessel specialized in the transport of offshore support personnel, deck cargo, and below-deck cargo such as fuel and potable water to and from offshore installations such as oil platforms, drilling rigs, drill and dive ships or wind farms.

Crew boats range in size from small, 30-to-60-foot (9.1 to 18.3 m) vessels working on bays, sounds and inland waterways to 200-foot (61 m) vessels that work as much as 200 nautical miles (370 km; 230 mi) offshore. Crew boats typically are constructed of aluminum and offshore vessels are most often powered by four-six turbo-charged diesel engines and propelled by conventional ship's screws or water jets.

In the United States, crew boats may carry any number of passengers up to the maximum noted on the vessel's United States Coast Guard certificate of inspection. For most offshore crew boats, the maximum number of passengers, accommodated in airline-style seats, is between 50 and 100.

In the Persian Gulf, crew boats often range from 18 m through to 50 m. A common size is the 42 m crew boat.

Crew boats typically are crewed at any given time by two licensed captains who each stand 12-hour watches, a deckhand or ordinary seaman, and an unlicensed engineer who also is responsible for some deck duties during his or her watch.

Crew members live aboard the vessel during their assigned rotations of duty (14-,21- and 28-day rotations are common in the United States), called "hitches" in the marine transportation industry.

Offshore crew boats are equipped with full galleys, dining areas, heads with showers, and staterooms for the crew. Overnight accommodations for passengers usually are not provided aboard crew boats.

== Notable crew boats ==
Ms. Netty, a 225-foot (68.6 m) crew boat delivered to Gulf Offshore Logistics by builder Gulf Craft in 2012, is reportedly the world's largest monohull crew boat. Ms. Netty boasts 4,380 square feet (407 m^{2}) of clear deck space and can carry 66,300 US gallons (250,973 L; 55,206 imp gal) of water and 77,204 US gallons (292,249 L; 64,286 imp gal) of transferable fuel, as well as 74 passengers. Ms. Netty boasts a top speed of 33 knots.

Seacor Cheetah, a 185-foot (56.4 m) catamaran was delivered by Gulf Craft to Seacor Holdings, Inc., in March 2008. This crew boat offers a top speed in excess of 40 knots and can carry up to 150 passengers, as well as 150 long tons (152 tonnes; 168 short tons) of deck cargo.

Mr. Steven, a 205-foot (62.5 m) crew boat that is equipped with a net to attempt to recover the payload fairing used in SpaceX rocket launches.

Tamimi 6, a 133.53-foot (40.7 m) crew boat delivered to High Seas Marine & Industrial by Dubai, UAE builder Grandweld in 2021, won the award from Baird Maritime Awards for Best OSV - Medium Crewboat in 2021.
