= Spanish patrol ship Río Segura =

Patrol boat of the Spanish Civil Guard

- Patrol ship Rio Segura moored in Dakar, Senegal

History

Spain
- Name: Río Segura
- Namesake: Segura
- Operator: Civil Guard
- Ordered: 29 August 2008
- Builder: Astilleros Gondán
- Cost: €15,323,600
- Yard number: C452
- Laid down: 18 April 2010
- Launched: 26 February 2011
- Sponsored by: Alfredo Pérez Rubalcaba
- Home port: Puntales Naval Station, Cádiz
- Identification: IMO number: 9561174; MMSI number: 225008350; Callsign: EAAE

General characteristics
- Displacement: 2,100 tonnes (2,100 long tons)
- Length: 73 m (239 ft 6 in)
- Beam: 12 m (39 ft 4 in)
- Propulsion: 2 × diesel engines 1,500 kW
- Complement: 32

Río Segura is the flagship patrol boat of the Maritime Service of the Spanish Civil Guard. It is named after the Segura river in southeastern Spain.
