= Celebrity Solstice =

Solstice-class cruise ship

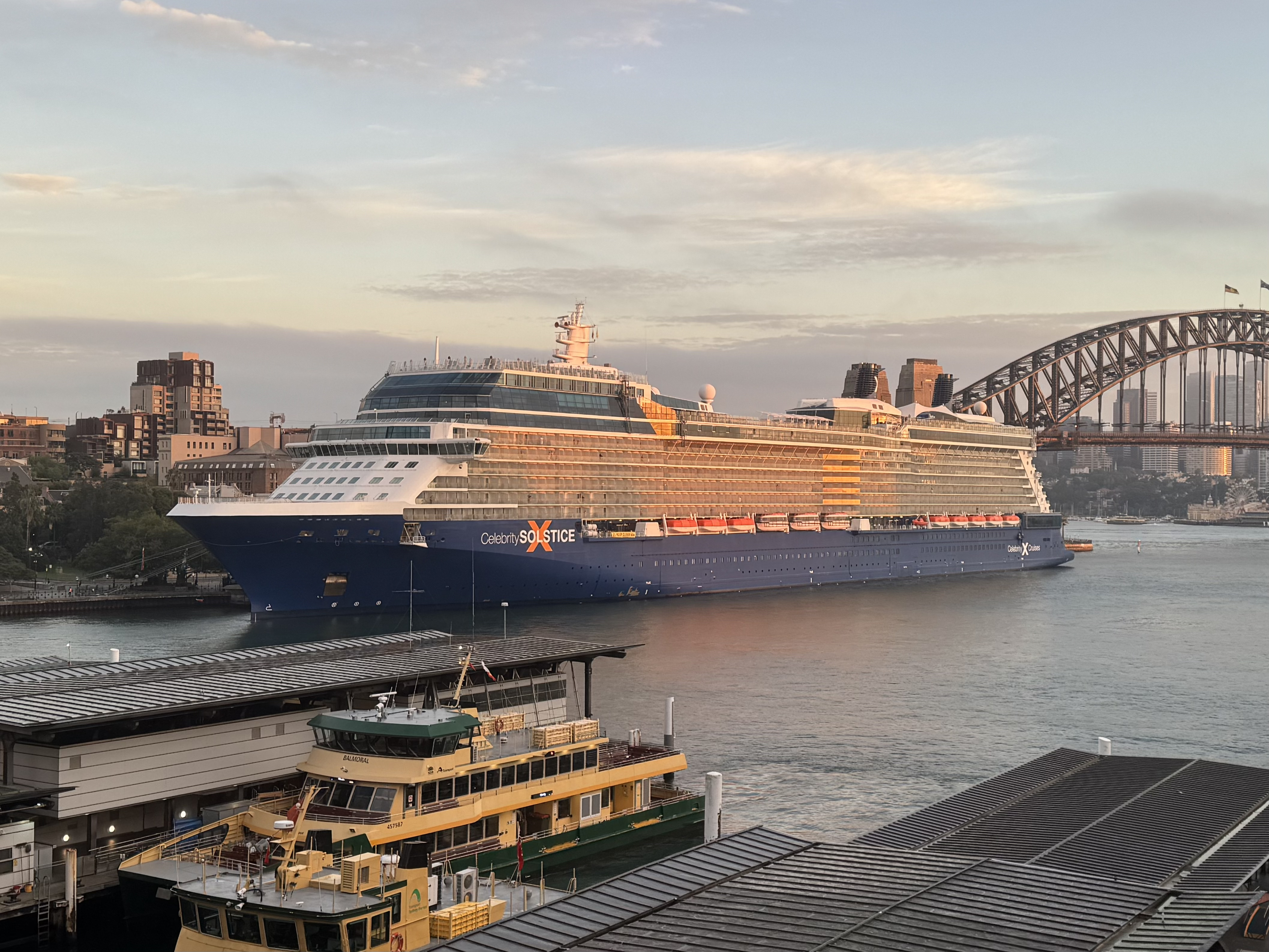
- Celebrity Solstice in Sydney, Australia, 9 April 2026

History

Malta
- Name: Celebrity Solstice
- Owner: Royal Caribbean Group; (2008); Celebrity Solstice Inc.; (2008–present)
- Operator: Celebrity Cruises
- Port of registry: Nassau, Bahamas; (2008); Valletta, Malta; (2008–present)
- Builder: Meyer Werft; Papenburg, Germany
- Cost: US$750 million
- Laid down: 17 March 2007
- Launched: 10 August 2008
- Sponsored by: Sharon L. Smith
- Christened: 14 November 2008
- Completed: October 2008
- Maiden voyage: 23 November 2008
- In service: 2008–present
- Refit: 15 January 2026 – 2 March 2026
- Identification: Call sign: 9HRJ9; IMO number: 9362530; MMSI number: 249409000
- Status: In service

General characteristics
- Class & type: Solstice-class cruise ship
- Tonnage: 121,878 GT; 82,363 NT; 9,500 DWT
- Length: 1,033 ft (314.86 m)
- Beam: 121 ft (36.88 m)
- Draft: 27 ft (8.23 m)
- Decks: 19
- Installed power: 4 × Wärtsilä 16V46
- Propulsion: Diesel-electric; two ABB Azipod propulsion units; (2 × 20.5 MW)
- Speed: 24 knots (44 km/h; 28 mph)
- Capacity: 2,852 passengers
- Crew: 1,250

Celebrity Solstice is the lead ship of the Solstice class of cruise ships operated by Celebrity Cruises, a subsidiary of Royal Caribbean Group. Built by Meyer Werft in Papenburg she was floated out on 10 August 2008 and christened by ocean scientist professor Sharon L. Smith at a ceremony in Fort Lauderdale, Florida, United States, on 14 November 2008. The first post-Panamax vessel in the Celebrity fleet, she features innovative interior design and a 12-deck-high atrium.

== History ==
=== Construction ===
The keel was laid in March 2007 at Meyer Werft in Papenberg, Germany. This would be Celebrity's return to the Meyer shipyard since the Century class, who also built Celebrity's first ships with the Horizon class. The Celebrity Solstice left Meyer Werft on September 28, 2008. The ship was the biggest cruise ship built in Germany to that point.

=== Delivery ===
The Celebrity Solstice arrived in Fort Lauderdale on November 3, 2008. Subsequently, she embarked on a series of short preview cruises for travel agents and dignitaries. On November 14, 2008, at Port Everglades, Fort Lauderdale, she was officially named by Sharon L. Smith. She began commercial service on November 23, 2008.

=== Refurbishments ===
Celebrity Solstice underwent an 11-day dry dock from October 22 to November 1, 2016, which added an outdoor movie screen to the top-deck Patio area among other upgrades.

In January 2026, Celebrity Solstice became the first ship to enter dry dock under Celebrity Cruises' "Celebrity Renewed" programme, a fleet-wide investment of more than $250 million to modernize all five Solstice-class ships. The ship was at Seatrium's Tuas Boulevard Yard in Singapore for just over six weeks, returning to service on March 2, 2026, and departing Singapore on a 12-night voyage to Hong Kong ahead of her Alaska season debut that May.

The refit added several venues new to the ship, upgraded all existing staterooms, and added 54 new cabins across four new stateroom categories, bringing the ship's total to 1,479 cabins. The ship's Lawn Club outdoor venue, a one-half-acre (2,000 m^{2}), manicured lawn with real grass on deck 15, was removed and retrofitted for the new Sunset Park venue with artificial turf. The Retreat, the ship's suite-class enclave, received a new sundeck with a hot tub and a redesigned private lounge, and AquaClass staterooms were refitted with spa-inspired amenities.

== Design ==
Yacht designer Martin Francis of Francis Design was hired to design her exterior profile. In original exterior renderings, the hull was shown as all-white with powder blue funnels and blue glass upper decks. The large dark blue funnel with a white X that has been the trademark of Celebrity was replaced by two thin funnels, and the company's X logo was to be visible in the glass balcony railings on the ship's midsection. Throughout her fitting out, sea trials, and launch, it was noted that the glass X, unless seen from certain angles, was not visible. Shortly after, the X was refinished to be darker but could still be hard to see. During sea trials, a white X was added to the forward funnel, making Celebrity Solstice more closely resemble her fleetmates.

The overall masterplan was completed by Boston-based Wilson Butler Architects, which would also design the entertainment venues, such as Main Theater, along with the Grand Foyer, and open decks, including the erstwhile Lawn Club. Other designers included Tihany Design, which designed the interior of the main dining room; BG Studio, which designed Cellar Masters, Passport Bar, Ensemble Lounge, the erstwhile Michael's Club, and Murano; 5+Design, which designed Galleria Boutique, Fortune Casino, Art Gallery; and RTKL, which designed the Spa.

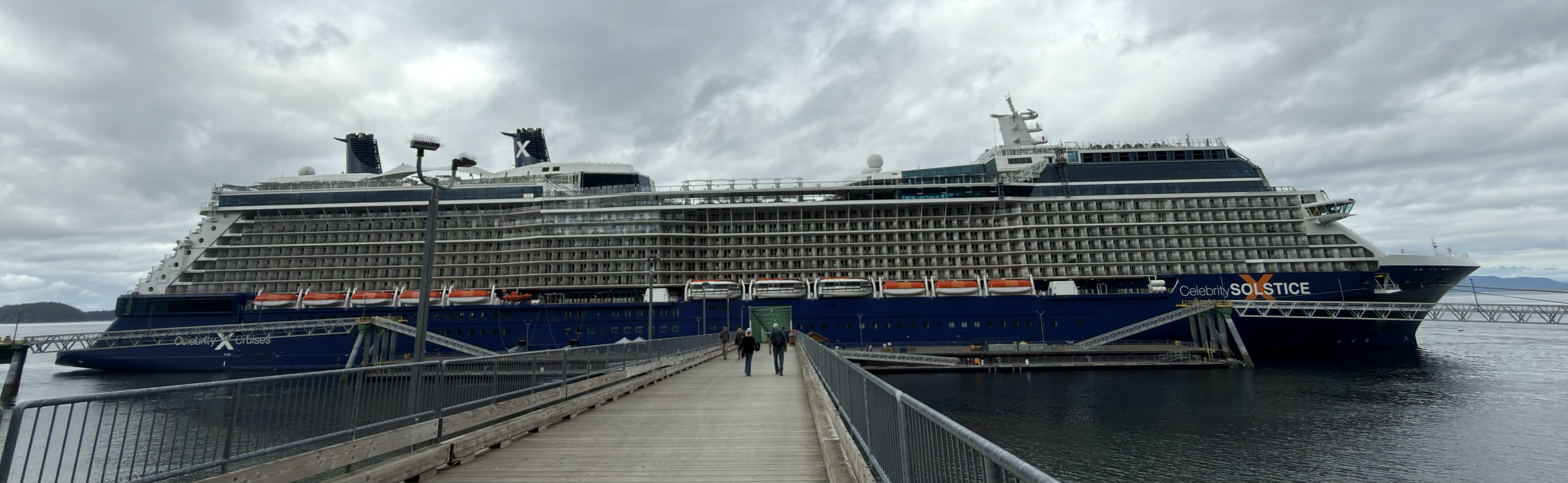
Celebrity Solstice at Icy Strait Point, Alaska

By January 2026, her hull had been repainted to Celebrity's trademark dark blue along with her other Solstice-class fleetmates to match the modern aesthetic of Celebrity's newer Edge-class ships.

=== Post 2026 Refurbishment Features ===
- Sunset Park: An outdoor social area on the top deck, hosting awn games and open-air concerts
- Solarium and the Spa's Persian Garden: An adults-only pool area
- Trattoria Rossa: An Italian speciality restaurant
- Fine Cut Steakhouse: A steakhouse; the concept was previously exclusive to Celebrity's Edge-class ships
- Murano: A French specialty restaurant
- Sushi on Five: A Japanese specialty restaurant
- Boulevard Lounge: An entertainment venue offering daytime programming and evening concerts, with an adjoining bar
- The Parlor: A sports and gaming lounge
- The Celebrity Shops: A shopping floor on deck 5 featuring luxury retailers like an authorized Breitling and Effy Jewelry stores
- The Retreat: A suite-class enclave that gained a new sundeck and lounge in the refit

=== Environmental Sustainability ===
The Celebrity Solstice is equipped with a photovoltaic system on the upper deck. 216 solar panels generate enough power to supply a large portion of the vessel's lighting. Together with other energy-efficient systems, particularly the air conditioning and ventilation systems, an optimized hull shape, and effective underwater coating, the ship features energy savings of approximately 30% compared to ships of similar size.

== Incidents ==
On May 17, 2022, a 40-year-old passenger, later identified by Alaska State Troopers as Selena Pau Pres of Houston, Texas, went overboard from Celebrity Solstice near Eldred Rock in the upper Lynn Canal while the ship sailed from Juneau to Skagway. The U.S. Coast Guard, assisted by the cutter Chandeleur, an MH-60 Jayhawk helicopter, and the ship's own lifeboats, searched Lynn Canal for about nine hours before suspending the operation later that day, citing an estimated survival time of roughly six hours in the 41 °F (5 °C) water. Alaska State Troopers identified the missing woman on May 20 and opened a death investigation; her body was not recovered.

== Gallery ==
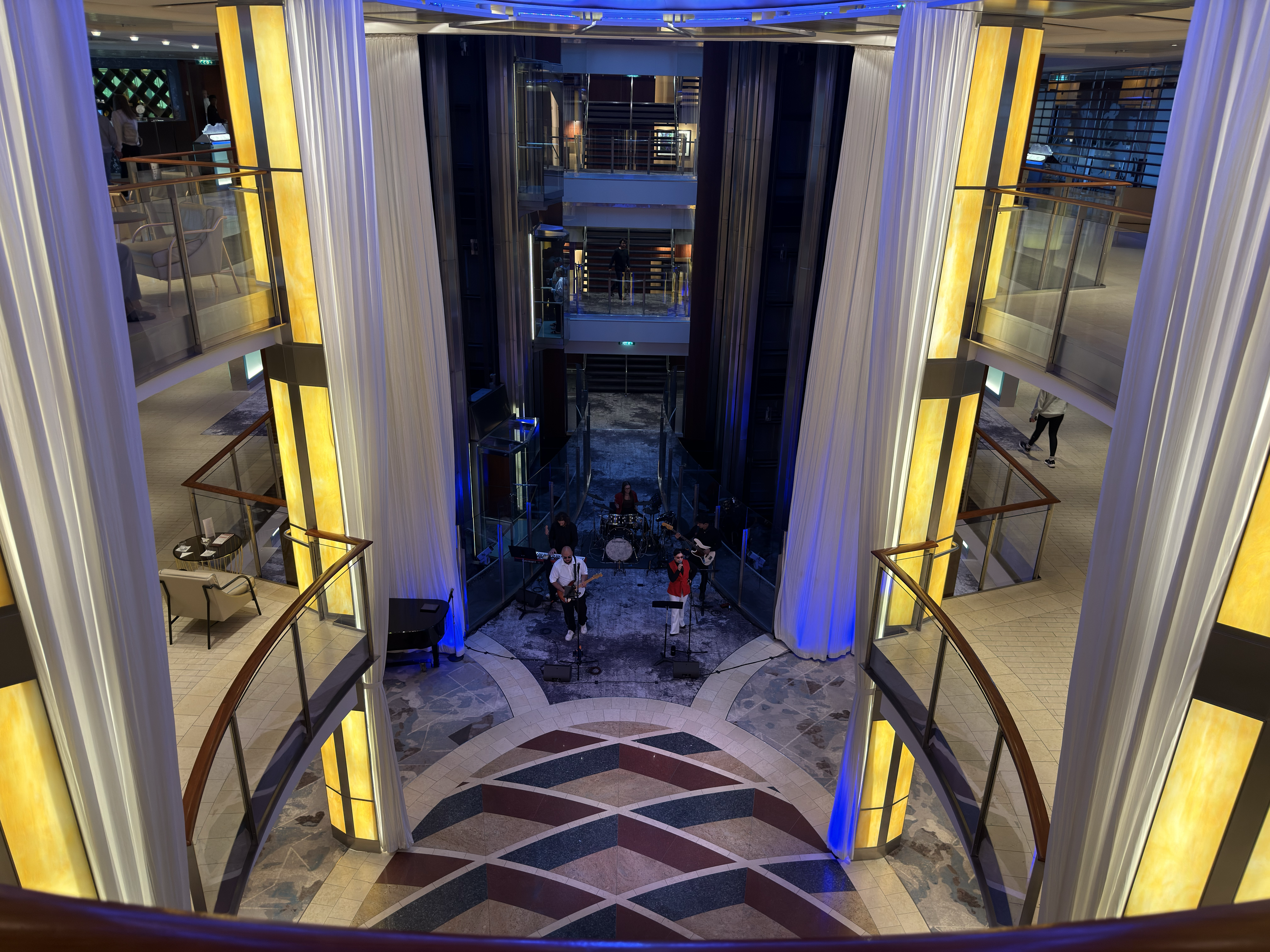
The Grand Foyer

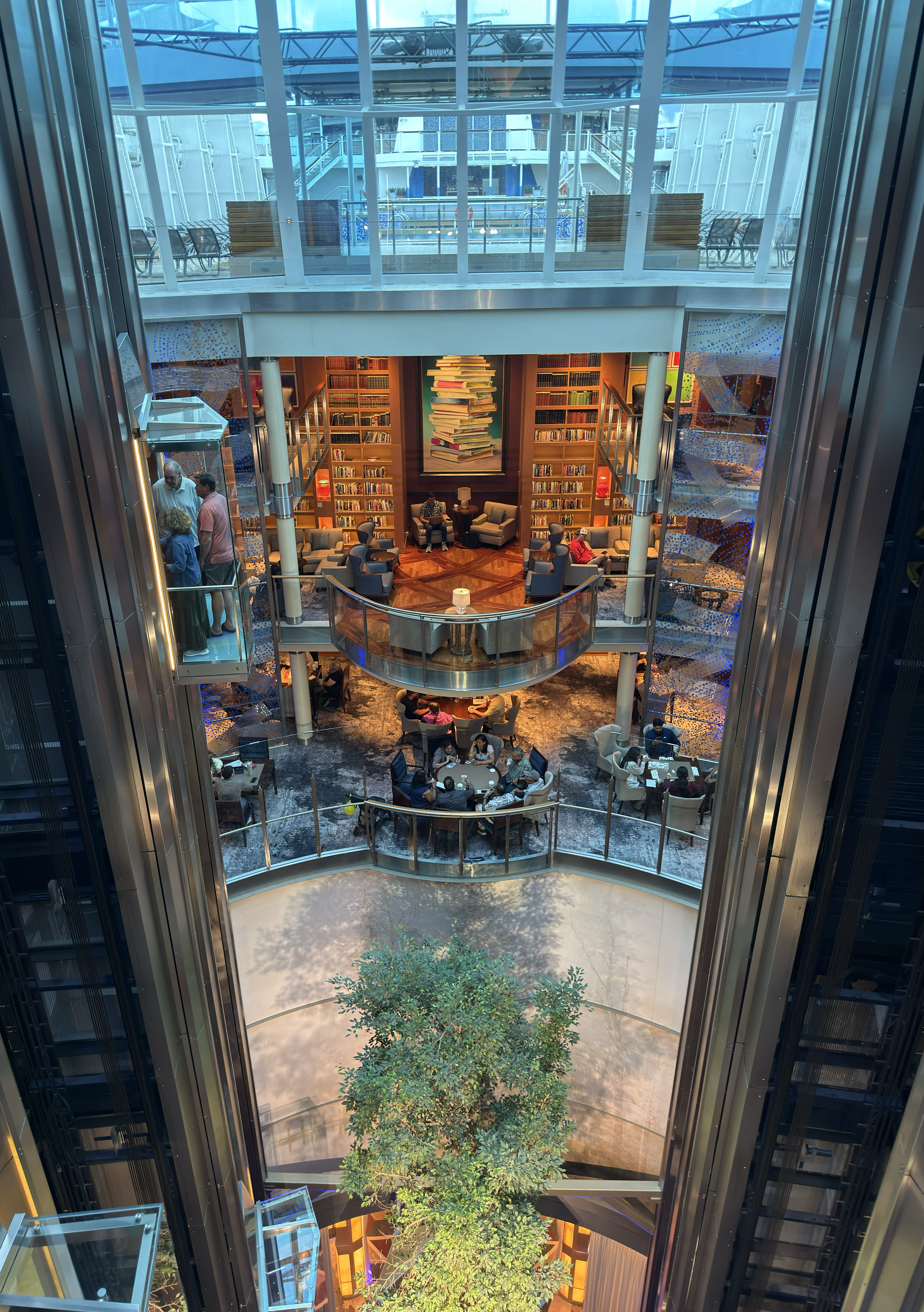
The Atrium, showing the library and card room

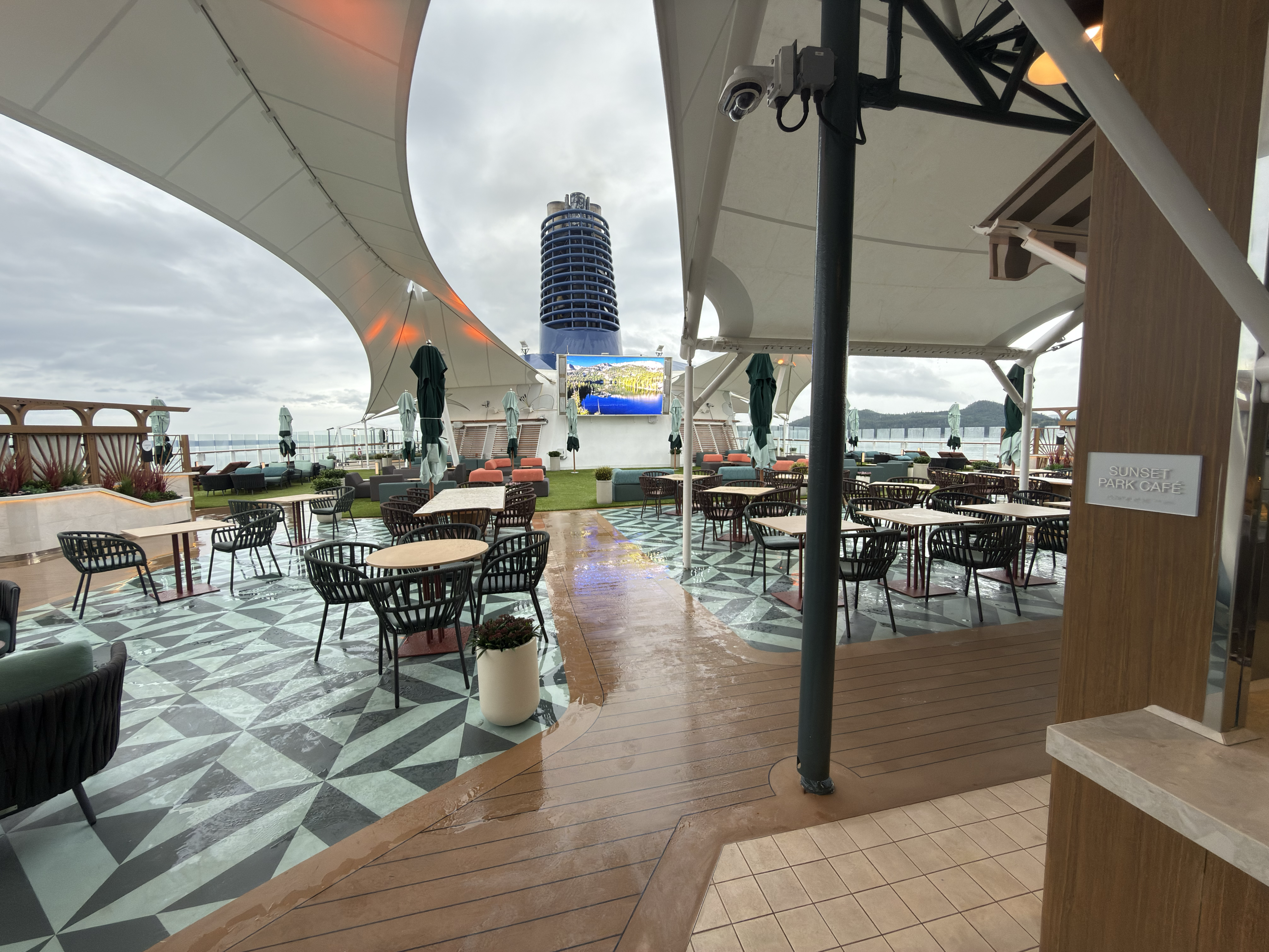
Sunset Park

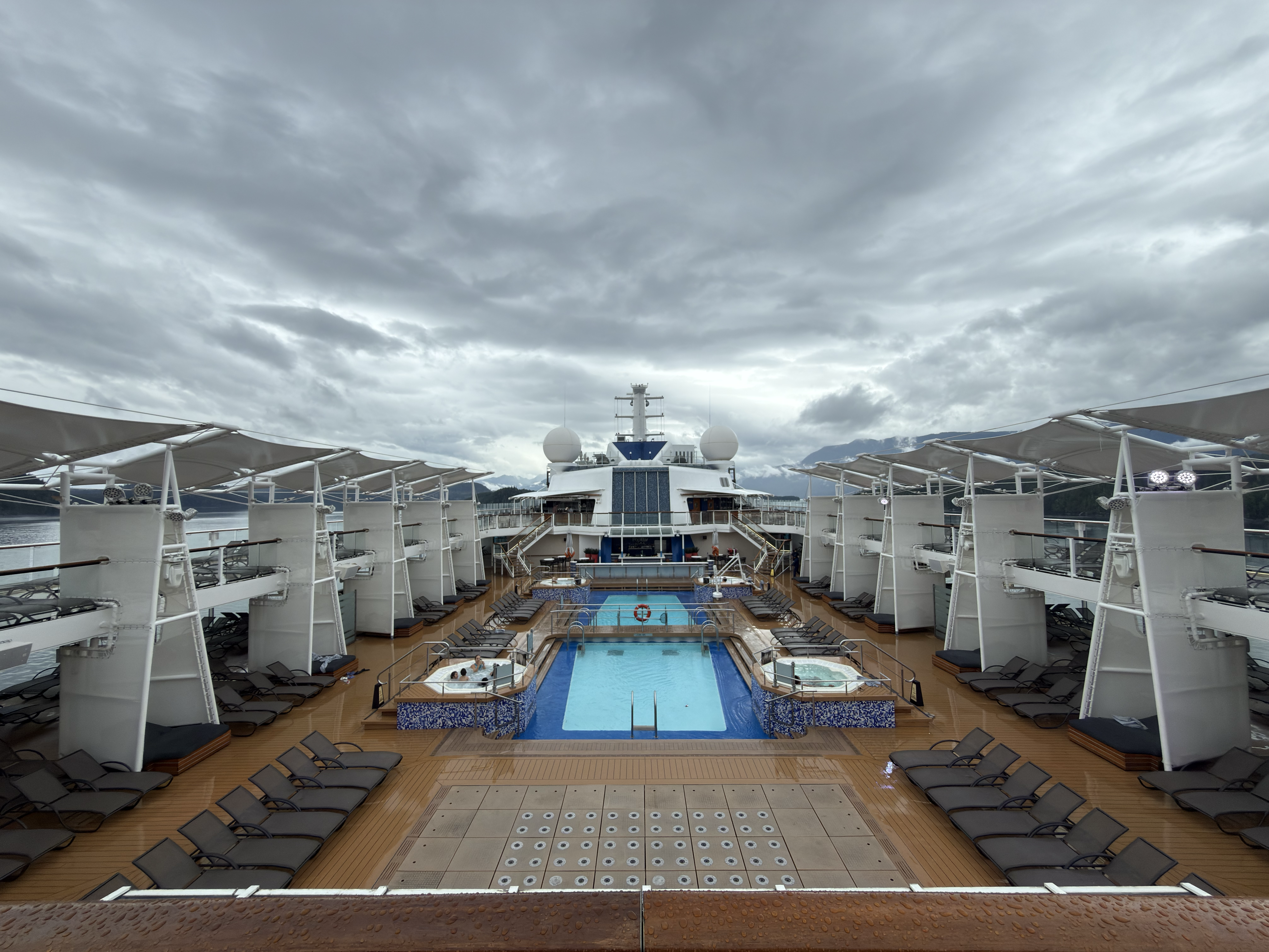
The Main Pool

== Bibliography ==
- Saunders, Aaron (2013). Giants of the Seas: The Ships that Transformed Modern Cruising. Barnsley, England: Seaforth Publishing. ISBN 9781848321724.
- Smith, Peter C. (2010). Cruise Ships: The World's Most Luxurious Vessels. Barnsley, South Yorkshire, UK: Pen & Sword Maritime. ISBN 9781848842182.
