= Orion Expedition Cruises =

Orion Expedition Cruises (OEC) was an Australia-based luxury expedition cruise line that operated the German-built 103-metre (338 ft) 4,000-gross ton cruise ship MV Orion in Australasian and Antarctic waters.

== History ==
Founded by Australian businesswoman Sarina Bratton in early 2004, Orion Expedition Cruises began cruising operations in March 2005 with the repositioning cruise of MV Orion from Papeete, Tahiti, in French Polynesia to Sydney, Australia, via the Cook Islands, Samoa, New Caledonia, Fiji, and Lord Howe Island. OEC operated expedition cruises from Australia to areas as diverse as the Antarctica, Papua New Guinea, and the Solomon Islands.

On 20 May 2008, Bratton, then managing director, announced the purchase of the company by the U.S. private equity firm KSL Capital Partners, and Cruise Ferry Master Fund (CFMF), a division of the German shipping bank DVB.

On 5 March 2013 it was announced that OEC had been acquired by US-based small ship operator Lindblad Expeditions, which owns five ships, charters a further five, and operates cruises to a variety of destinations. CFMF also holds a 60% interest in Lindblad Expeditions.

== Operations ==
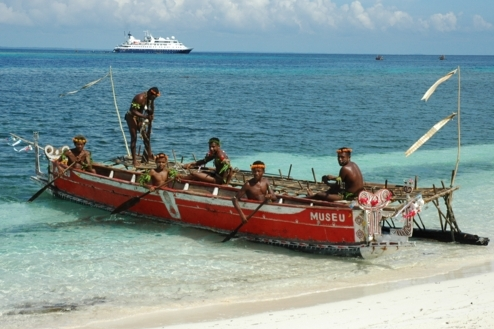
MV Orion anchored off Kitava in Papua New Guinea's Trobriand Islands with a traditional kula canoe in the foreground

The concept behind the formation of OEC was to bring a new flavour of locally based luxury expedition-style cruising to Australia.

In 2005 OEC made history as the first cruise line to take a ship into the newly independent nation of East Timor. Visiting the capital, Dili, and the nation's second-largest centre. Baucau, guests aboard Orion were some of the first tourists to be part of organised travel in the country. OEC planned to continue and expand their operations in East Timor in 2006, but the company's plans were suspended when the fledgling nation became unstable just a few weeks before Orion was due to dock in Dili in June 2006. The Indonesian port of Kupang in West Timor replaced Dili in OEC's itinerary.

The company offered expedition cruises to Antarctica from the Australian island of Tasmania and the New Zealand port of Bluff, in the remote Kimberley region of Western Australia from the port of Darwin to Papua New Guinea and the Solomon Islands from the ports of Cairns and Rabaul, as well as occasional cruises along the east coast of Australia focusing on the Great Barrier Reef and some cruising around Tasmania.

Following OEC's acquisition by Lindblad Expeditions in March 2013, it was announced that cruises to Orion′s destination mainstays of Indonesia, Borneo, Papua New Guinea, and the Kimberleys would continue. In March 2014 itineraries to more easterly and remote Pacific islands were added. Orion was to be equipped with an remotely operated underwater vehicle (ROV), capacity for up to 24 scuba divers and oceangoing kayaks, with cruises to be accompanied by a National Geographic Society photographer.

In a statement in January 2015, Lindblad surprised the industry by announcing that Orion would be based in Europe for the northern summer from 2016, ceasing Southern Hemisphere winter operations.

== MV Orion ==
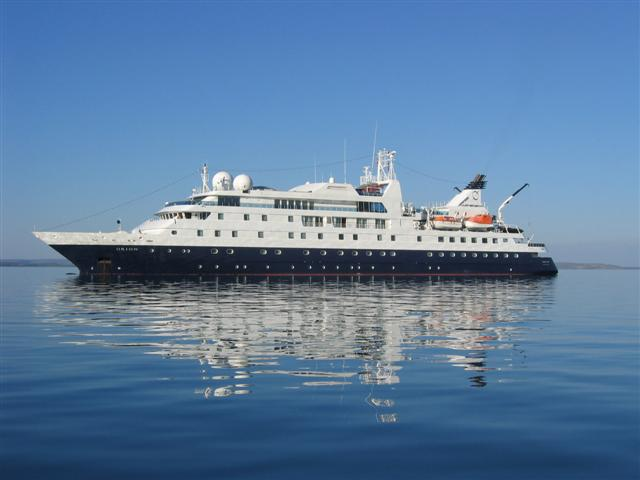
MV Orion in Kuri Bay on Western Australia's Kimberley Coast.

The luxury expedition ship Orion, the backbone of OEC, has been described by the Berlitz Guide to Cruising as "the latest in the quest to build the perfect expedition vessel". Owned by the Marshall Islands-registered company Explorer Maritime and leased under a long-term agreement by OEC, the vessel was previously operated, albeit for a short time, by the U.S.-based cruise operator Travel Dynamics International (TDI). TDI had operated the vessel in the Antarctic and the Arctic and many points in between before handing the vessel over to OEC in the Tahitian port of Papeete in March 2005.

Orion was renamed National Geographic Orion in March 2014 and joined Lindblad Expeditions-owned National Geographic Endeavour, MS National Geographic Explorer, National Geographic Islander, National Geographic Sea Bird, and National Geographic Sea Lion, along with their chartered vessels Delfin II, Jahan, Lord of the Glens, Oceanic Discoverer, and Sea Cloud.

=== Vessel specifications ===
- Length: 103 metres (337 ft 11 in)
- Beam: 14.25 metres (46 ft 9 in)
- Draft: 3.82 metres (12 ft 6 in)
- Hull: Ice-reinforced for voyages in the Arctic and Antarctic
- Ice Class: E3 (Germanischer Lloyd)
- Gross Tonnage: 4,000
- Engines: Mak; 8M25; 3,265 horsepower (2,435 kW)
- Speed: 14 knots (26 km/h; 16 mph)
- Stabilisers: Blohm & Voss, retractable fin stabilisers
- Manoeuvrability: Bow and stern thrusters
- Year Built: 2003
- Delivery Date: November 2003
- Builder: Cassens Shipyard-Emden, Germany
- Staterooms and Suites: 53
- Guest Capacity: 106 (twin occupancy). 24 additional guests may be accommodated in convertible sofa or upper Pullman beds.
- Elevator: Yes
- Classification: Germanischer Lloyd; 100 A5 E3 passenger ship; MC E3 AUT
- Regulations: Orion is built according to the latest international safety regulations, including those of the United States Coast Guard, United States Public Health Service, Canadian Arctic Shipping, and Saint Lawrence Seaway.
- Additional Craft: 10 Zodiac Heavy Duty MK5 Inflatables, 10 sea kayaks, and a fishing boat
- Communications: Direct-dial satellite telephones; fax; e-mail; Internet access; internal telephone system
- Registry: The Bahamas flag; crewed and provisioned by V-Ships Leisure of Monaco.

== See also ==
- List of cruise ships
- List of cruise lines
