= Celebrity Flora =

Cruise ship

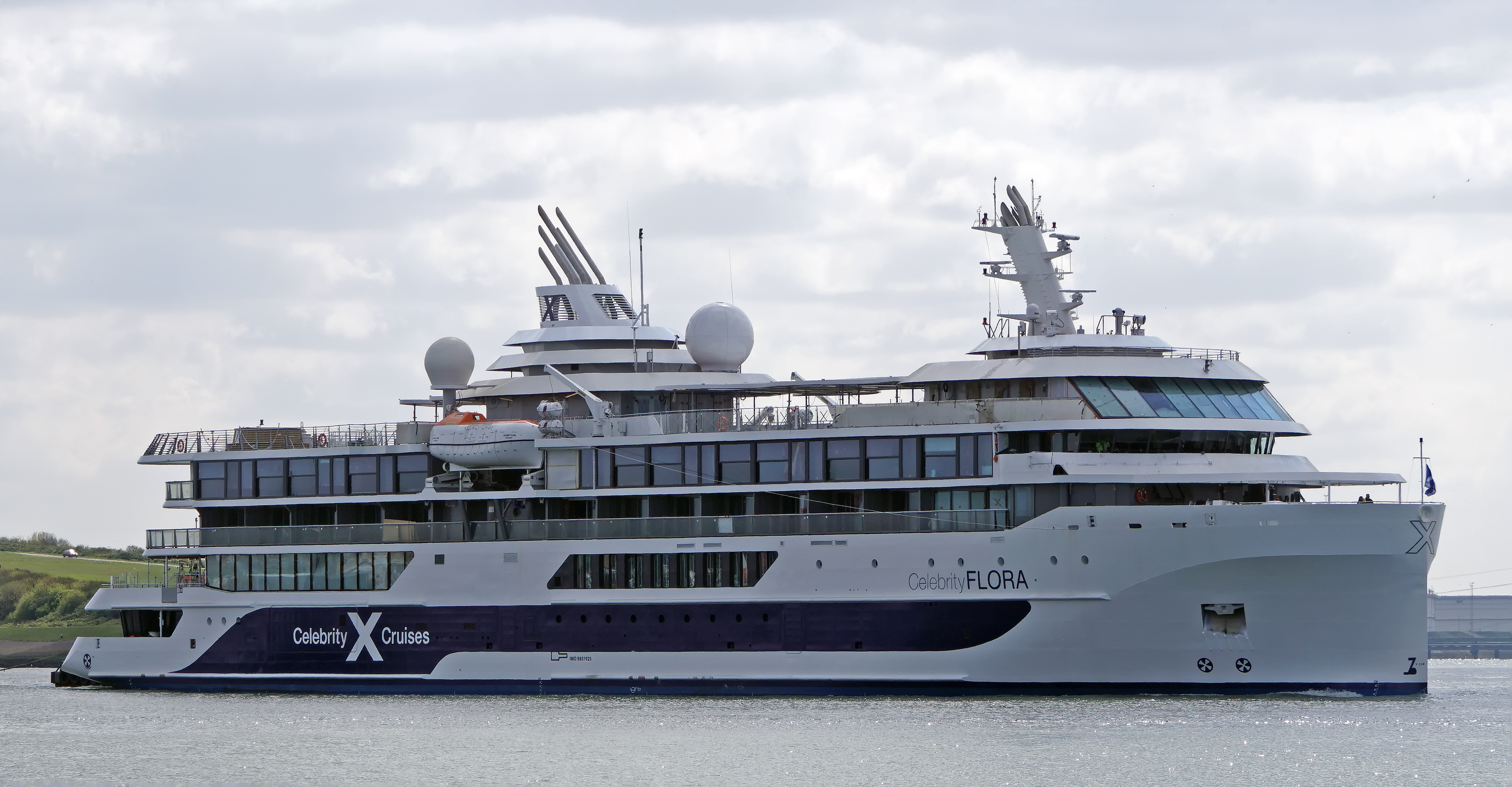
- Celebrity Flora near Hook of Holland, 2019

History

Ecuador
- Name: Celebrity Flora
- Owner: Royal Caribbean Group
- Operator: Islas Galapágos Turismo y Vapores C.A. (Ecuador-based subsidiary of Royal Caribbean Group)
- Port of registry: Guayaquil, Ecuador
- Builder: Shipyard De Hoop; Lobith-Tolkamer, Netherlands
- Yard number: 488
- Laid down: 15 December 2017
- Launched: 29 January 2019
- Sponsored by: Yolanda Kakabadse
- Christened: 24 June 2019
- Acquired: 13 May 2019
- Maiden voyage: 30 June 2019
- In service: 2019–present
- Identification: IMO number: 9837925
- Status: In service

General characteristics
- Type: Expedition cruise ship
- Tonnage: 5,922 GT; 1,200 DWT
- Length: 101.5 m (333 ft)
- Beam: 17 m (56 ft)
- Draught: 4.5 m (15 ft)
- Depth: 6.5 m (21 ft)
- Decks: 6
- Installed power: Four Caterpillar C32 diesel generators
- Propulsion: Two Steerprop type 20 CRP rudder propellers of 1.45 megawatts (1,940 hp) each
- Speed: 12 knots (22 km/h; 14 mph) (Service speed); 14.5 knots (26.9 km/h; 16.7 mph) (Maximum speed)
- Capacity: 100 passengers
- Crew: 80

Celebrity Flora is an expedition cruise ship operated by Islas Galápagos Turismo y Vapores C.A., a subsidiary of Royal Caribbean Group, and exclusively sails along the Galápagos Islands. Built by Shipyard De Hoop of the Netherlands and delivered in 2019, she is the first new expedition ship built for Celebrity Cruises and is the largest vessel by gross tonnage to operate in the region.

== History ==
=== Planning and construction ===
On 16 November 2017, Celebrity announced it was building Celebrity Flora, a new 100-passenger vessel designed to be permanently based in the Galápagos, with a tentative debut set for May 2019. In the announcement, it explained the decision to build a vessel for the Galápagos came out of a desire to expand its expedition business and also fill a larger void in the Galápagos market to realize its potential. At the time, Celebrity had been operating three smaller and older ships (Celebrity Xploration, Celebrity Xperience, and Celebrity Xpedition) in the region, but sought to offer a newer option for cruisers interested in the Galápagos and also desired to replace existing capacity.

On 30 November 2017, Celebrity announced it had reached an agreement with Shipyard De Hoop in Lobith-Tolkamer, Netherlands to design and construct Celebrity Flora, making her the shipyard's first expedition vessel. Royal Caribbean also signed an option for a second ship, which was later ordered as the Silver Origin for Silversea Cruises.

On 15 December 2017, the keel-laying ceremony for the ship was held, in which a 49.2-ton block was lifted for a lucky coin to be placed in the dock before the block was lowered into position. On 29 January 2019, she was floated out from the shipyard, after which she sailed to Rotterdam to complete her outfitting, including construction on her upper deck. On 15 April 2019, she began her sea trials, which wrapped up on 18 April 2019, and moved to Schiedam to finish all final outfitting shortly thereafter.

On 13 May 2019, Celebrity Flora was delivered at a ceremony in Rotterdam. She departed Rotterdam for a 25-day transatlantic crossing to the Galápagos on 15 May. The ship was christened by former World Wide Fund for Nature president Yolanda Kakabadse at Baltra Island on 24 June 2019.

=== Operational career ===
Celebrity Flora was originally scheduled to operate her first revenue sailing on 26 May 2019 from her year-round homeport of Baltra Island. However, her first sailing was later postponed to 30 June 2019. The ship sails week-long sailings from Baltra Island in conjunction with available 10-, 11-, or 16-night packages that include corresponding land expeditions.

==== COVID-19 pandemic ====
Early in the COVID-19 pandemic, the Galápagos' first island-related death attributed to the coronavirus was reported to be a crew member in his 60s who had fallen ill after leaving the ship and returning to Quito. On 14 April 2020, the Provincial Emergency Operations Committee of the Galápagos Islands reported that of the 69 crew members of Celebrity Flora who had been tested so far, 48 tests returned positive for SARS-CoV-2. Further tests later returned additional positive cases, bringing the total case count of the Galápagos to 72. By early May, the cases aboard Celebrity Flora accounted for almost half of the total cases in the Galápagos.

== Design and specifications ==
Celebrity has stated that the design and accommodations on Celebrity Flora are heavily inspired by the design of Celebrity Edge overall, while also having a large emphasis on outdoor space. In accordance with Galápagos' regulations, the ship is flagged in Ecuador and staffed by Ecuadorian crew members, 80 of which work aboard the ship and are housed across 52 cabins. She also has a maximum guest capacity of 100 guests, housed across 50 passenger cabins of various sizes. Initial details announced that Celebrity Flora would measure 5,635 GT (later specified as 5,922 GT).

Described as the "most energy-efficient ship of its kind in the region," the ship is built to comply with two-compartment damage stability regulations and Galápagos National Park's regulations. Her bow is designed with a straight stem and an integrated bulb that includes a short bow thruster tunnel; it works to reduce wave resistance when cruising and allows the ship to save energy when stagnant, contributing to a 15% reduction in fuel consumption and emissions when compared to her older expedition fleet-mates. Other purpose-built features include a dynamic positioning system that helps her avoid needing to drop anchor in the waters surrounding the islands to protect the seabed, and a zero-speed stabilizer system that is designed to minimize rolling motions when cruising. Two engine rooms house the power and propulsion plant, which consists of two Steerprop type 20 CRP rudder propellers of 1.45 megawatts (1,940 hp) each and two Veth bow thrusters of 0.4 megawatts (540 hp) each; all are supplied by four Caterpillar C32 diesel generators, which are equipped with selective catalytic reduction to reduce nitrogen oxide emissions. The system gives the vessel a service speed of 12 knots (22 km/h; 14 mph).

Celebrity has used Celebrity Flora to develop programs and partnerships with other organizations for its guests and Galápagos residents alike. Celebrity and EarthEcho International partnered to develop sustainability projects, including protecting the Galápagos' plants and wildlife. Additionally, each voyage includes one naturalist per 12 guests onboard and will guide enrichment lectures and other activities.
