= Kitava =

Island in the Solomon Sea

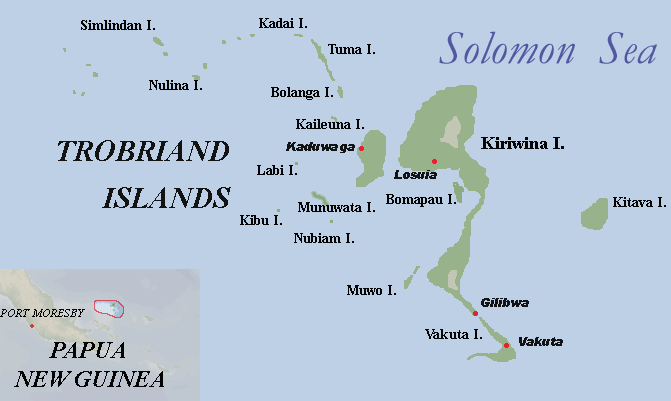
- Interactive map of Kitava

Geography
- Location: Solomon Sea
- Coordinates: 8°37′20″S 151°20′04″E
- Archipelago: Trobriand Islands
- Adjacent to: Pacific Ocean
- Major islands: Kitava, Kiriwina, Kaileuna, Vakuta

Administration
- Papua New Guinea
- Province: Milne Bay Province

Additional information
- Time zone: AEST (UTC+10)

Kitava is the most easterly of the four major islands in the Trobriand Islands archipelago group of the Solomon Sea, located in Milne Bay Province of southeastern Papua New Guinea (PNG).

== Lifestyle ==
Kitava has primarily a subsistence economy. Food sources are mainly fish and yams. As in the other islands in the Trobriand group yams play a significant role in the culture and determine wealth. The islands have dark, rich soils that support diverse species beyond yams and coconuts, including mangoes, papayas and pineapple. Marine life flourishes in the clear seas and the coral reefs. However, deforestation is a growing concern. Kitava is a regular stop for tourist vessels, which provides some cash income.

== Ethnography ==
The inhabitants of this island and their diet and lifestyle have been the subject of study by researcher Staffan Lindeberg and his colleagues, due to their reported excellent health and traditional diet. Lindeberg et al. have published several works in peer-reviewed journals outlining their discoveries. In a study of 1,200 subjects, including 300 adolescents and young adults, by Lindeberg and others over 843 days, not one example of western ailments, such as obesity, diabetes or acne, was found. Lindeberg attributed this to the islanders' diet of yams, sweet potatoes, and taro (all part of a group known as tubers), local fruits (namely coconut), fish, and vegetables.

== World War II ==
The American steamship Admiral Wiley (not to be mistaken for USS Riley) was wrecked at Kitava on 13 June 1940. In May 1940, Japanese ships passed Kitava on their way to the Battle of the Coral Sea. Wreckage from the battle washed up on Kitava's beaches for several months. Large quantities of American biscuits, coffee and benzine were found. On 2 October 1942, Japanese pilot, Shigenori Murakami, crash landed his plane on a nearby island through lack of fuel. He made his way to Kitava where Australian coastwatchers demanded that he surrender. Instead, he responded with fire and was killed. He died fully clothed, wearing his helmet, glasses, gloves, and overalls. Kitava is the only high island in the Trobriand group and an American radar station was established there to give warning on low-flying enemy aircraft. The island was accidentally bombed by Allied forces when blasting being carried out to build a new road was mistaken for enemy fire.

== See also ==
- Trobriand Islands topics
