= Losuia Airport =

Airport in Kiriwina Island, Milne Bay, Papua New Guinea

Coordinates: 8.5051°S 151.0800°E

- IATA: LSA; ICAO: AYKA

Summary
- Location: Losuia, on the island of Kiriwina, Papua New Guinea
- Opened: 1943
- Elevation AMSL: 21 ft (6.4 m)
- Interactive map of Losuia Airport

Losuia Airport is an airport in Losuia, on the island of Kiriwina, Papua New Guinea.

== History ==
Kiriwina Airfield was a coral surfaced 6,000 feet (1,800 m) long x 150 feet (46 m) wide single runway, built by US Army Engineers with assistance from combat troops shortly after occupying the island on 30 June 1943 during World War II. A C-47 was the first aircraft to land at the airfield on 2 August 1943. US Navy Seabees from the 60th Naval Construction Battalion expanded the airfield constructing a 7,000 feet (2,100 m) taxiway, 25 fighter hardstands, a 5,300 feet (1,600 m) taxiway and 16 bomber hardstands. Also known as South Drome, upon completion of North Drome on the northern part of Kiriwina.

=== Allied Units based at Kiriwina Airfield ===
- No. 22 Squadron RAAF - Douglas Boston
- No. 30 Squadron RAAF - Bristol Beaufighter
- No. 76 Squadron RAAF - Curtiss P-40 Kittyhawk
- No. 78 Squadron RAAF - Kittyhawks
- No. 79 Squadron RAAF - Supermarine Spitfire
- No. 6 Mobile Works Squadron RAAF
- No. 12 Repair and Salvage Unit RAAF
- No. 114 Mobile Fighter Sector RAAF

== Airlines and destinations ==
PNG Air connects Losuia Airport to Gurney Airport (Alotau).
