= National Geographic Endeavour =

Ship built in 1966

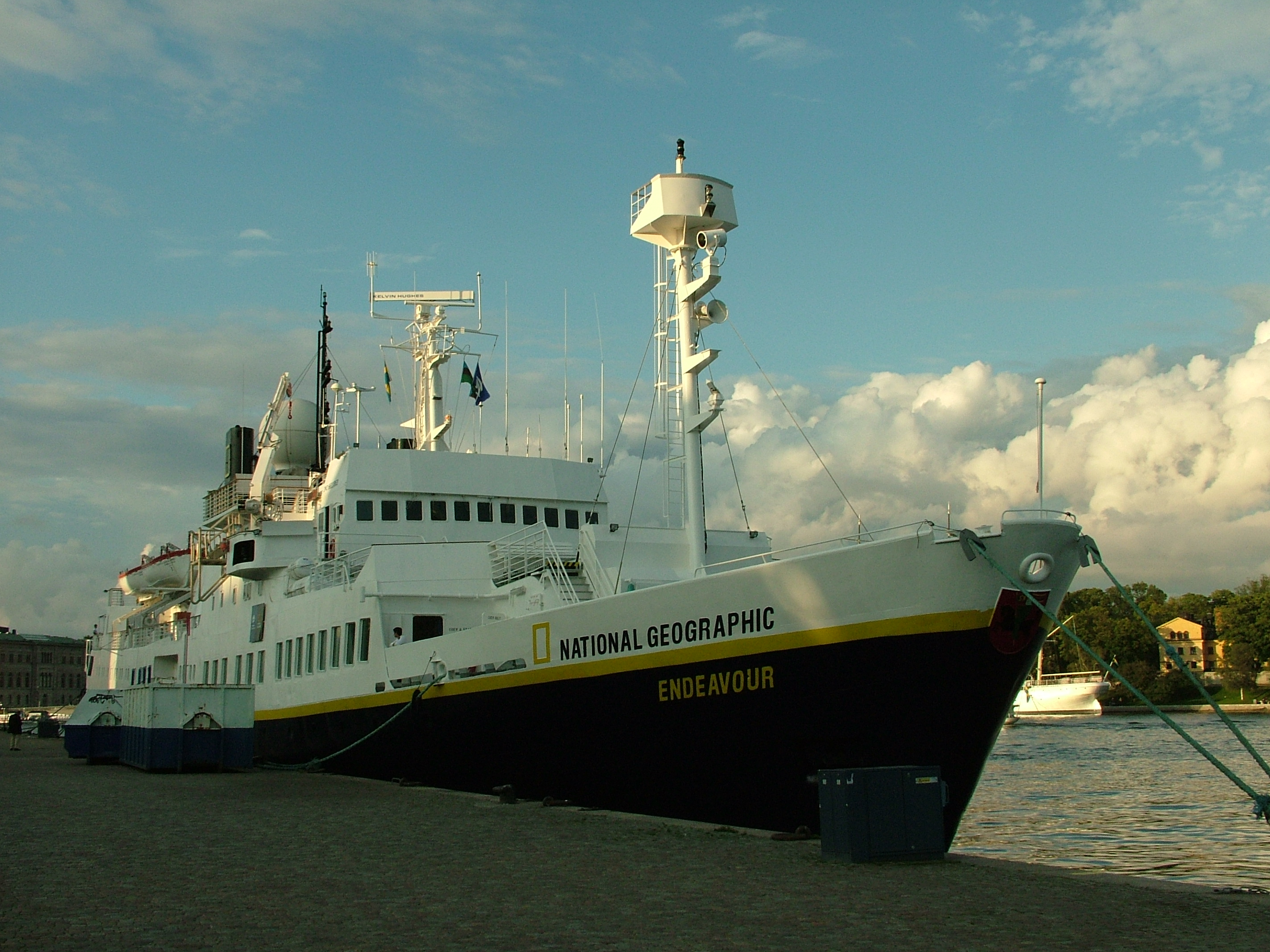
- The National Geographic Endeavour in the Skeppsbrokajen harbour of Stockholm, August 2008

History
- Name: Marburg (1966–1982); Lindmar (1982–1983); North Star (1983–1989); Caledonian Star (1989–2001); Endeavour (2001–2005); National Geographic Endeavour (2005–)
- Owner: Lindblad Expeditions
- Port of registry: 1966–2011: Nassau, Bahamas; 2011–: Guayaquil, Ecuador
- Builder: Weser Seebeck, Bremerhaven, Germany
- Yard number: 917
- Laid down: 1 October 1965
- Launched: 26 February 1966
- Completed: 9 June 1966
- Converted: 1983
- Identification: Call sign: HC5241; IMO number: 6611863; MMSI number: 735058913
- Fate: Scrapped 2017

General characteristics
- Type: Cruise ship
- Tonnage: 3,132 GT; 1,045 NT; 732 DWT
- Length: 89.17 m (292 ft 7 in)
- Beam: 14.03 m (46 ft 0 in)
- Draft: 5.7 m (18 ft 8 in)
- Depth: 9 m (29 ft 6 in)
- Decks: 6
- Ice class: DNV ICE-C
- Installed power: 2 × MaK 8M582AK (2,387 kW)
- Propulsion: Single shaft, controllable-pitch propeller; Bow thruster
- Speed: 11.5 knots (21.3 km/h; 13.2 mph)
- Capacity: 169 passengers
- Crew: 64

MS National Geographic Endeavour was a small expedition ship operated by Lindblad Expeditions for cruising in remote areas, particularly the polar regions.

== History ==
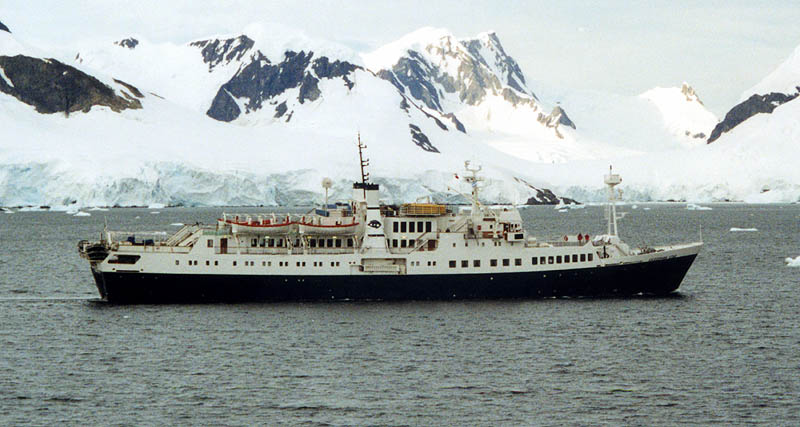
Caledonian Star passing through Antarctica's Paradise Bay, February 2001, just days before being hit by a rogue wave

The ship was originally a fishing trawler built in 1966 as Marburg, and converted to carry passengers in 1983. First named North Star, then Caledonian Star; she received her present name in June 2001.

On March 2, 2001, the ship was struck by a 30-metre-high rogue wave while crossing the Drake Passage. The wave smashed the windows of the bridge and ruined the navigation and communications equipment, but did not cripple the ship. She was assisted by the Argentine Navy ocean fleet tug ARA Alférez Sobral and reached Ushuaia three days later.

When National Geographic Endeavour was retired, the piano was donated to the Tomas de Berlanga school in Santa Cruz, Galápagos. The bridge ceiling, notched with polar bear sightings from her time in Svalbard, is with Sven Lindblad. The model, valuable art and other mementos were saved. Some items were transferred to National Geographic Endeavour II.

National Geographic Endeavour was scrapped on 6 May 2017.
