= Sia Airfield =

Defunct airport in Papua New Guinea

- IATA: none; ICAO: none

Summary
- Built: 1943
- In use: 1943-1945
- Occupants: United States Army Air Forces
- Coordinates: 8°25′32.22″S 151°5′5.41″E
- Interactive map of Sia Airfield

Runways
Direction	Length		Surface
Direction	ft	m	Surface
32/14	5,900	1,830	crushed coral

Sia Airfield, also known as Kiriwina North Drome, was an airfield built on the northern end of Kiriwina Island during the Second World War. It was built by the No. 6 Airfield Construction Squadron RAAF in August 1943 but mainly used by the United States Army Air Forces. The airfield ran roughly northwest to southeast with a taxiway and revetments on each side of the airfield.
