= National Geographic Endurance =

Ice-strengthened expedition ship owned by Lindblad Expeditions

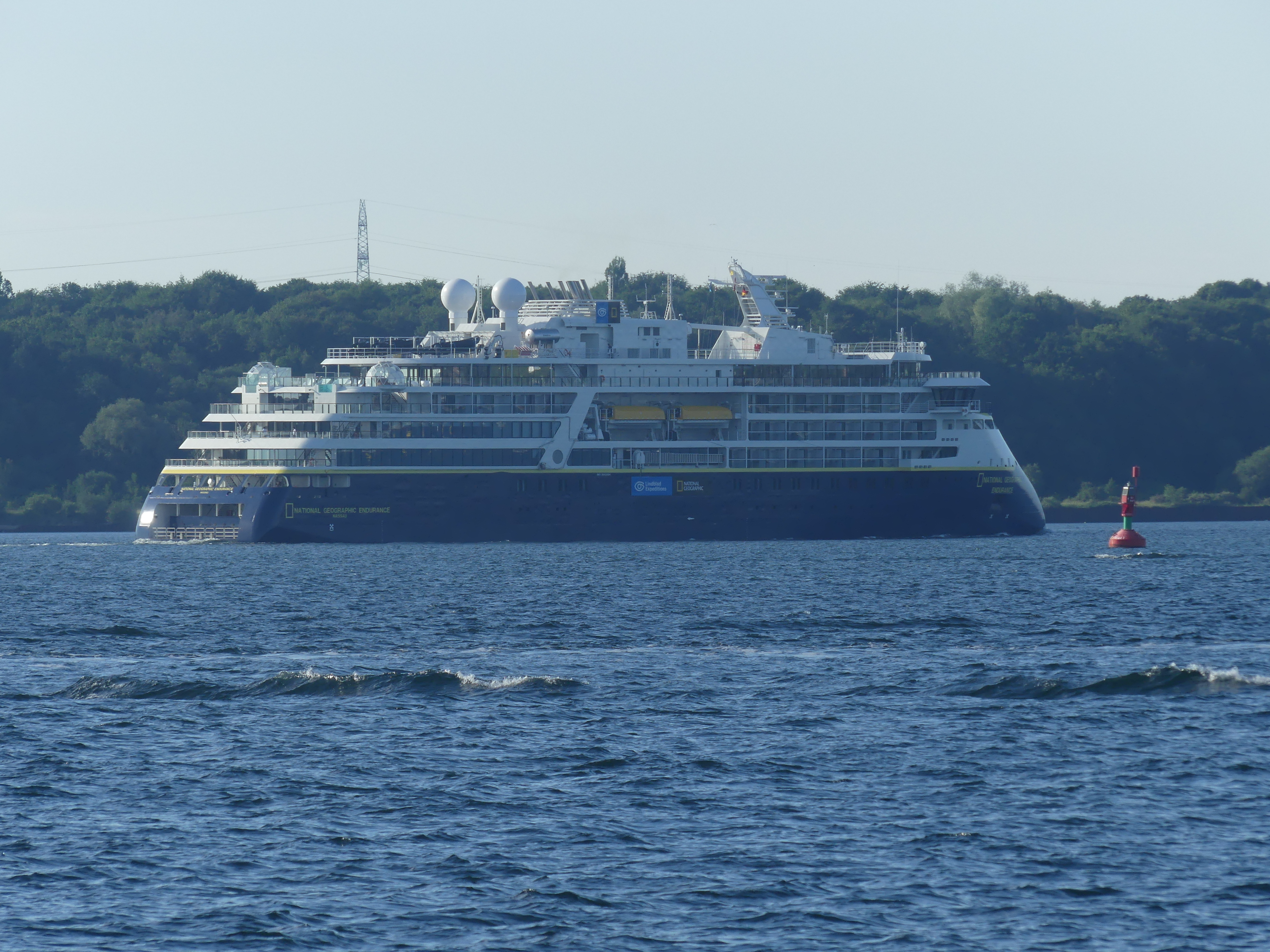
- National Geographic Endurance at Kiel, Germany

History

The Bahamas
- Name: National Geographic Endurance
- Owner: Lindblad Expeditions
- Operator: Lindblad Expeditions
- Port of registry: Nassau, Bahamas
- Ordered: 7 November 2017
- Builder: CRIST (Gdynia, Poland); Ulstein Verft (Ulsteinvik, Norway)
- Cost: US$135 million (equivalent to $167.9 million in 2025)
- Yard number: NB 312
- Laid down: 17 March 2018
- Launched: 23 April 2019 (hull); 7 December 2019
- Sponsored by: Jen Martin and Ana Esteves
- Completed: 16 March 2020
- Identification: IMO number: 9842554; MMSI number: 311000929; Call sign: C6EL6
- Status: In service

General characteristics
- Tonnage: 12,786 GT; 1,250 DWT
- Length: 124.4 m (408 ft 2 in)
- Beam: 21 m (68 ft 11 in)
- Draught: 5.3 m (17 ft 5 in)
- Decks: 6
- Ice class: PC 5
- Installed power: General Electric producing 7 MW (9,387 hp)
- Speed: 17.3 kn (32.0 km/h; 19.9 mph)
- Capacity: 138
- Crew: 116

National Geographic Endurance is an expedition ship with an ice-strengthened hull owned and operated by Lindblad Expeditions. The vessel has an ice-strengthened X-bow hull. She is the lead vessel of the Endurance class. The ship was followed by a sister ship, National Geographic Resolution in 2021.

The hull was constructed at the CRIST shipyard in Gdynia, Poland, and finishing work was completed at Ulstein Verft in Ulsteinvik, Norway. Construction of the vessel began on 17 March 2018, she was launched on 24 April 2019, and completed in March 2020.

The ship was named in honor of Antarctic explorer Ernest Shackleton and his vessel, Endurance.

The X-bow design, previously used in offshore industry vessels, is intended to reduce the impact of waves on the hull, which decreases noise and vibration and enhances onboard comfort. Its shape also reduces the risk of wave splashing, minimizing hazards on deck from slippery or icy surfaces.
