= List of ships named MS Midnatsol =

Several motor ships have borne the name Midnatsol:

- MS Midnatsol (1949) was a 2,097-ton passenger/cargo ship completed in November 1949, by Riuniti of Ancona, Italy. Renamed twice, lastly as Midnatsol Norge in 1983. Foundered off Fredrikstad, Norway, on 1 February 1987. Raised, and scrapped in Bruges, Belgium in June 1987.
- MS Midnatsol (1982) is a 4,131-ton passenger/cargo ship launched on 22 May 1982, by Ulstein Hatlo, in Ulsteinvik, Norway. As of 2013 sailing as the Bahamas-registered MS National Geographic Explorer.
- MS Midnatsol (2002) is a 16,140-ton passenger/cargo ship launched on 26 April 2002, by Fosen Mekaniske Verksteder, in Rissa Municipality, Norway. Renamed MS Maud in 2021.
