= National Geographic Resolution =

Ice-strengthened expedition ship owned by Lindblad Expeditions

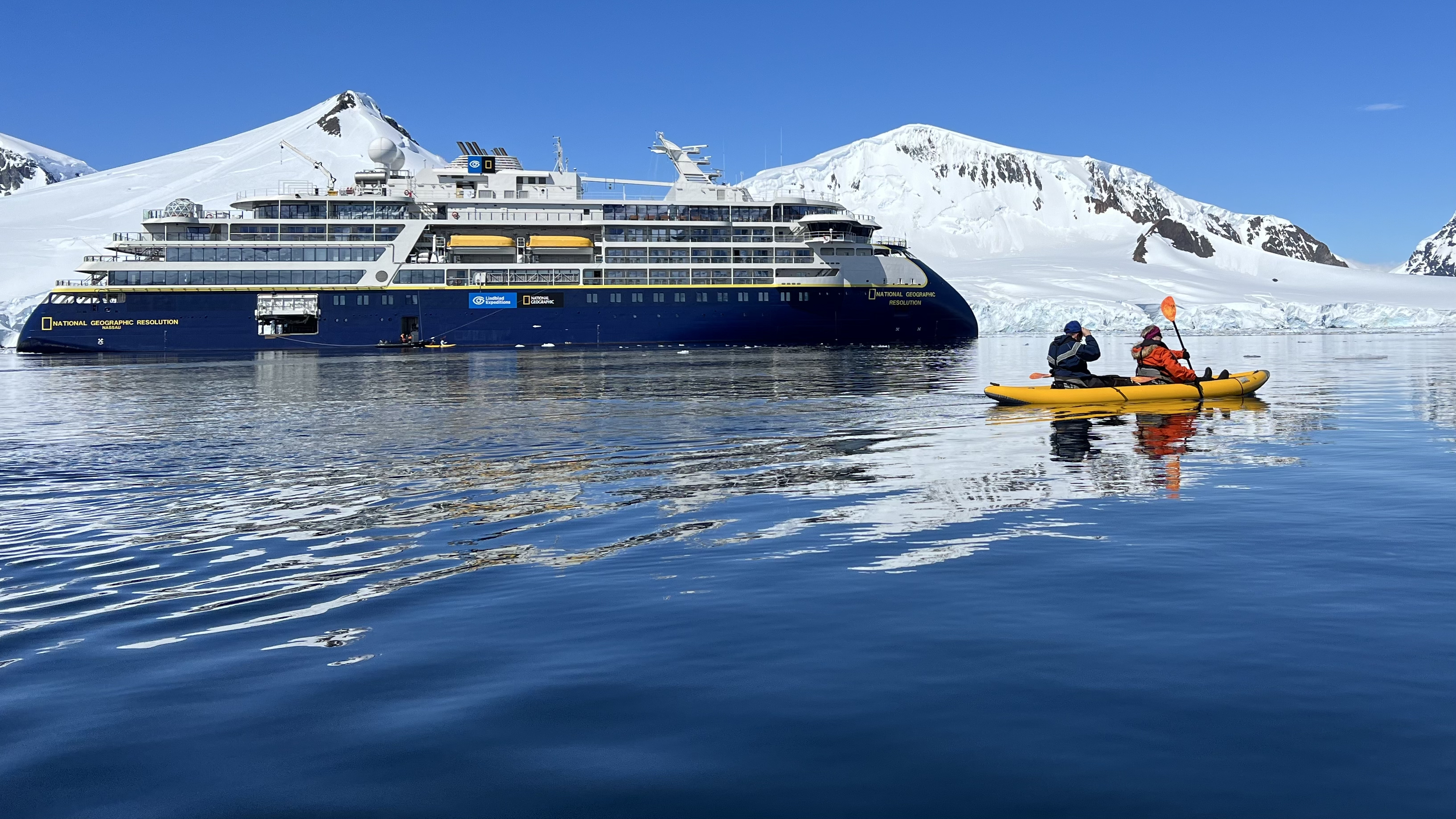
- National Geographic Resolution in Antarctic waters

History

The Bahamas
- Name: National Geographic Resolution
- Owner: Lindblad Expeditions
- Operator: Lindblad Expeditions
- Port of registry: Nassau, Bahamas
- Ordered: February 28, 2019
- Builder: CRIST (Gdynia, Poland); Ulstein Verft (Ulsteinvik, Norway)
- Cost: US$135 million (equivalent to $160.4 million in 2025)
- Yard number: NB 316
- Laid down: September 18, 2019
- Launched: October 16, 2020 (hull); June 9, 2021
- Sponsored by: Heidi Norling
- Completed: September 30, 2021
- Identification: IMO number: 9880685; MMSI number: 311000893; Call sign: C6EH2
- Status: In service

General characteristics
- Class & type: Endurance-class expedition ship
- Tonnage: 12,786 GT; 1,250 DWT
- Length: 124.4 m (408 ft)
- Beam: 21 m (69 ft)
- Draft: 5.3 m (17 ft)
- Decks: 6
- Ice class: PC 5
- Installed power: General Electric producing 7 MW (9,387 hp)
- Propulsion: 2 × Azipod
- Speed: 16.5 kn (30.6 km/h; 19.0 mph)
- Capacity: 138
- Crew: 116

National Geographic Resolution is an expedition ship with an ice-strengthened hull owned and operated by Lindblad Expeditions. The vessel has an ice-strengthened X-bow hull. She is the second vessel of the Endurance class, following National Geographic Endurance (2020).

== Design and construction ==
The vessel was ordered on February 28, 2019. The hull was constructed at the CRIST shipyard in Gdynia, Poland and later transferred to Ulstein Verft in Ulsteinvik, Norway, for outfitting and completion. She was laid down on September 18, 2019, and the hull was launched on October 16, 2020, and moved to Ulstein Verft. After further construction the complete vessel was launched again on June 9, 2021. The ship was delivered to Lindblad on September 30, 2021.

National Geographic Resolution was christened on November 24, 2021, on an ice sheet in Antarctica's Weddell Sea by Captain Heidi Norling, one of the vessel's captains and Lindblad's first international fleet female captain.

The vessel was named in honor of explorer James Cook and his ship HMS Resolution, which crossed the Antarctic Circle in 1773.

National Geographic Resolution features an ice-strengthened hull with an X-bow design, a configuration originally developed for offshore vessels. The design reduces wave impact, improves stability in rough seas, and enhances fuel efficiency. The ship holds a Polar Class PC5 rating, enabling operation in medium first-year ice conditions.

The vessel is equipped with Azipod azimuth thrusters to enhance maneuverability in ice and confined waters. Installed power is rated at 7 megawatts (9,400 hp), and the ship has a service speed of approximately 16.5 knots (30.6 km/h; 19.0 mph).

== Specifications ==
National Geographic Resolution has a gross tonnage of 12,786 GT and a deadweight tonnage of 1,250 DWT. The vessel measures 124.4 meters (408 ft) in length, with a beam of 21 meters (69 ft) and a draft of 5.3 meters (17 ft). She has six decks and accommodates 138 passengers with a crew of 116.

== Operations ==
The vessel entered service in November 2021 for the Antarctic season. She operates expedition voyages, including sailings south of the Antarctic Circle, and is designed to access remote polar regions.

Daily expedition activities typically include ice landings, guided hikes, Zodiac excursions, and kayaking. Through Lindblad Expeditions' partnership with National Geographic, voyages often include scientists and naturalists who provide educational programming and conduct research related to marine conservation, climate science, and wildlife monitoring.

Onboard facilities include multiple dining venues, a spa, gym, and library.
