= No. 6 Airfield Construction Squadron RAAF =

Australian construction squadron during World War 2

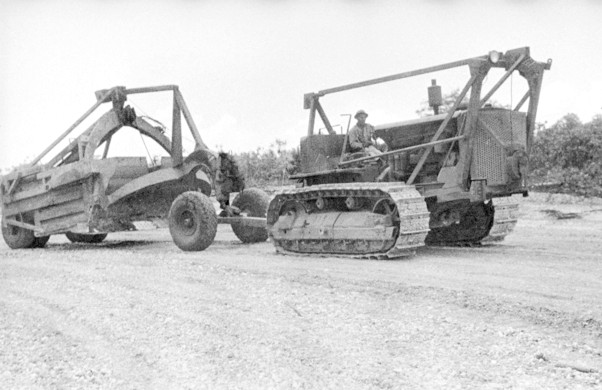
- Equipment of No. 6 Mobile Works Squadron (later No. 6 Airfield Construction Squadron) at Kiriwina, Papua, in September 1943
- Active: 1942–1945
- Country: Australia
- Branch: Royal Australian Air Force
- Role: Airfield construction
- Engagements: World War II: New Guinea Campaign; Borneo Campaign

No. 6 Airfield Construction Squadron (No. 6 ACS) was a Royal Australian Air Force (RAAF) construction squadron. It was formed as No. 6 Mobile Works Squadron in December 1942 and operated in the New Guinea Campaign and Borneo Campaign during World War II. No. 6 ACS was disbanded in December 1945.
