= Vakuta =

Island in Papua New Guinea

Coordinates: 8°51′7″S 151°10′1″E

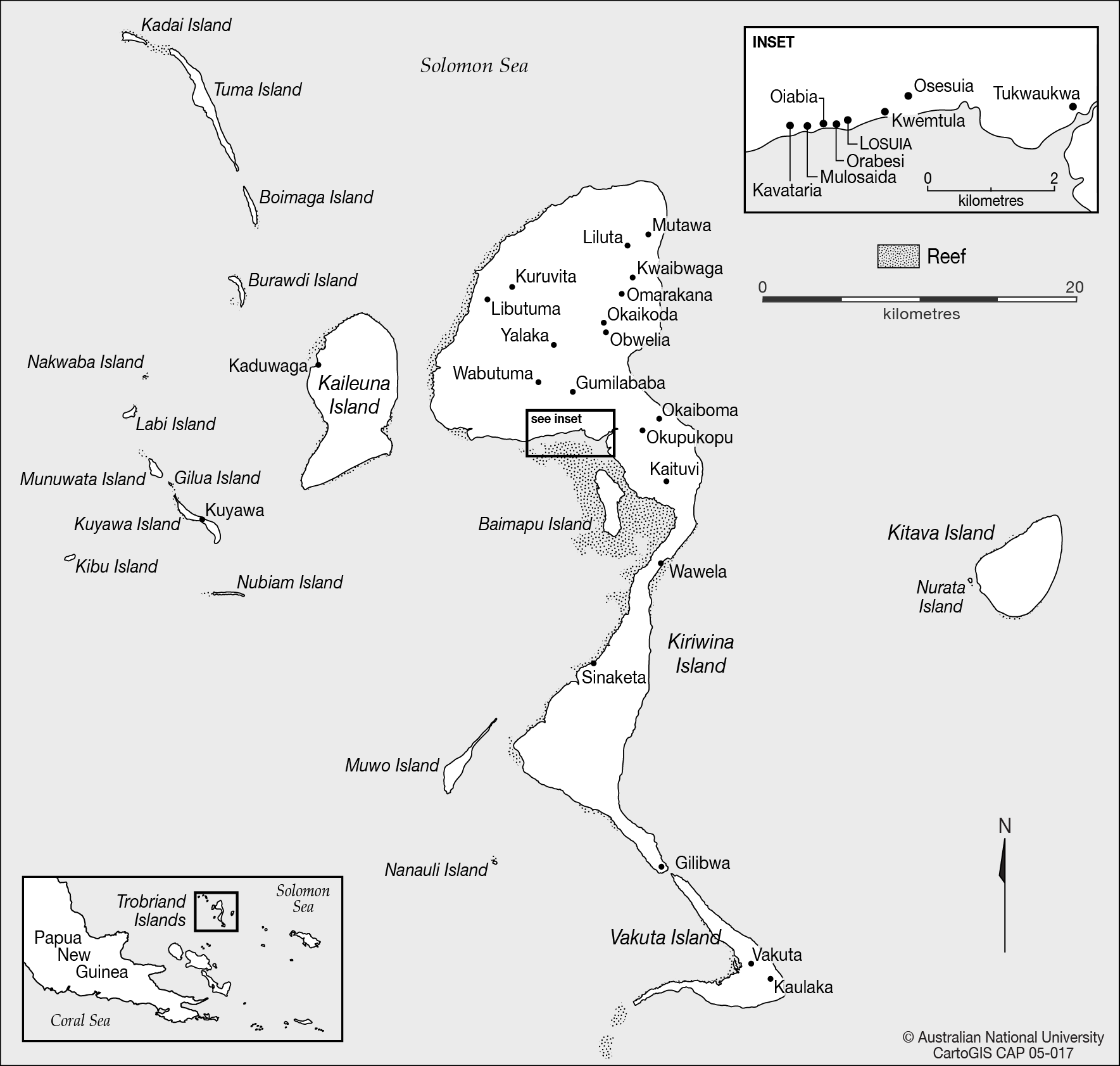
Vakuta immediately south of Kiriwina on the map of the Trobriand Islands

Vakuta is an island in the Trobriand Islands group of Papua New Guinea.

Vakuta is a near continuation of the Trobriands' main island Kiriwina to the south, separated from it only through the 400-metre (1,300 ft) wide Kasilamaka Passage. It has an area of 21.16 km^{2} (8.17 square miles). At the census of population in 2000, Vakuta had a population of 971.
