= National Geographic Quest =

Coastal expedition ship owned by Lindblad Expeditions

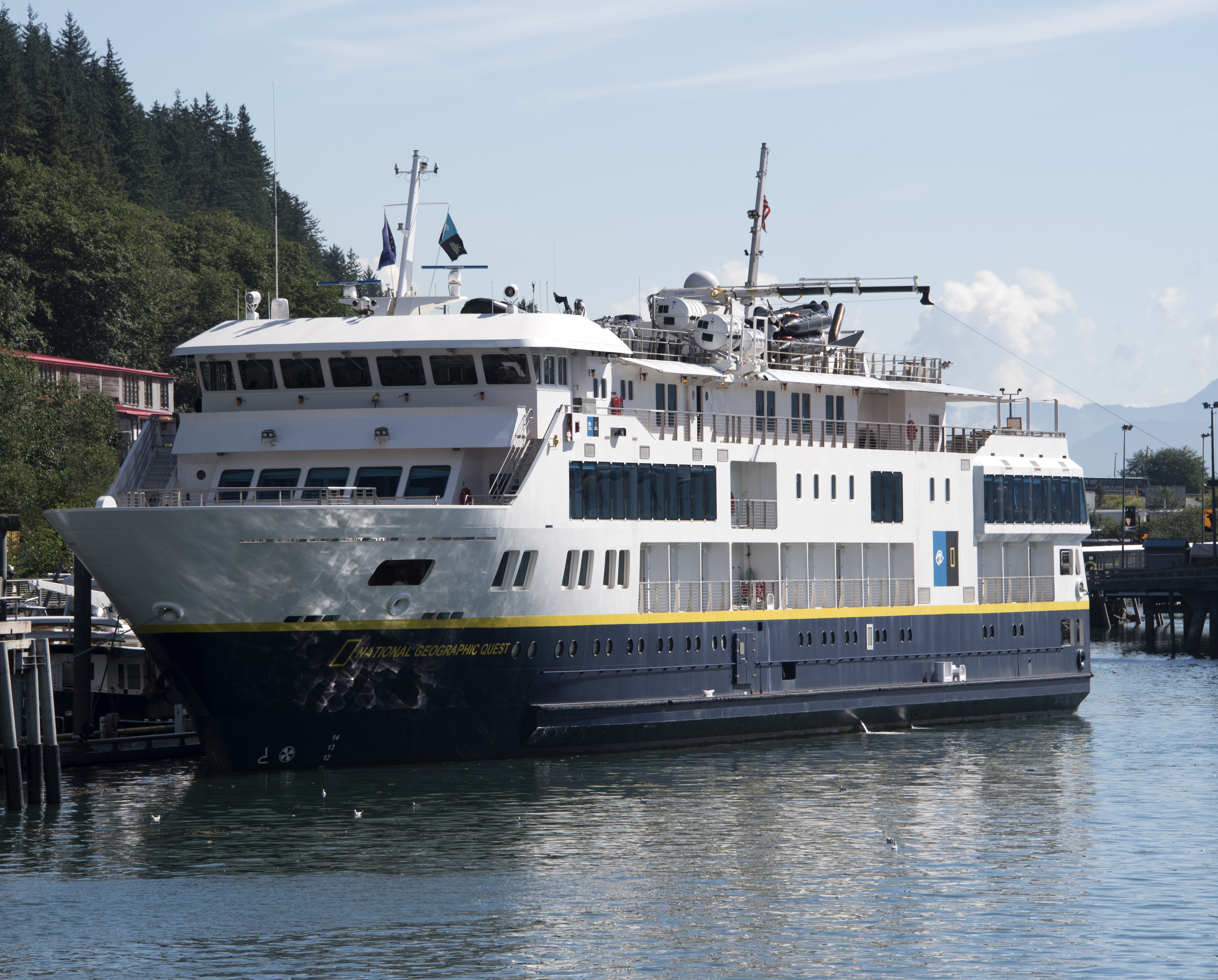
- National Geographic Quest in Juneau, Alaska, 2018

History

United States
- Name: National Geographic Quest
- Owner: Lindblad Expeditions
- Operator: Lindblad Expeditions
- Port of registry: Seattle, Washington
- Ordered: December 8, 2015
- Builder: Nichols Brothers Boat Builders (Freeland, Washington)
- Cost: US$48 million (equivalent to $65.2 million in 2025)
- Yard number: S-188
- Launched: June 15, 2017
- Maiden voyage: July 29, 2017
- Identification: IMO number: 9798985; MMSI number: 366945000; Call sign: WDJ3521
- Status: In service

General characteristics
- Class & type: Quest-class expedition ship
- Tonnage: 2,920 GT
- Length: 72.69 m (238 ft 6 in)
- Beam: 13 m (44 ft)
- Draft: 3.7 m (12 ft)
- Decks: 4
- Installed power: 2 × 12-cylinder MTU diesel engines producing 1,600 hp (1,200 kW) each; 2 × 6-cylinder Volvo Penta diesel engines producing 477 kW (640 hp) each
- Propulsion: 2 × five-blade Wärtsilä propellers
- Speed: 12 kn (22 km/h; 14 mph)
- Capacity: 100
- Crew: 52

National Geographic Quest is a coastal expedition cruise ship operated by Lindblad Expeditions. She is the lead vessel of the Quest class and was followed by her sister ship, National Geographic Venture (2018). National Geographic Quest was the first new-build vessel ordered by Lindblad and was constructed in the United States by Nichols Brothers Boat Builders at their Freeland, Washington, shipyard on Whidbey Island.

== Design and construction ==
National Geographic Quest and her sister ship, National Geographic Venture, were commissioned as Lindblad's first purpose-built new vessels. They were designed for expedition cruising along the Pacific coasts of North and Central America, including Alaska, British Columbia, and the Pacific Northwest during the northern summer, and Panama, Costa Rica, Baja California, and other Central American destinations during the winter. The vessels were designed with a shallow draft and high maneuverability to allow access to inner coastal waterways while providing accommodations suitable for extended voyages.

The contract for the two ships was reported at approximately $94.8 million, with the cost of National Geographic Quest estimated at $48 million.

Construction was carried out at Nichols Brothers Boat Builders at their Freeland shipyard. The vessel was launched in early June 2017 using an inflatable-bag rolling system. During the launch, the ship sustained damage when a propeller and rudder made contact with the seabed while the vessel was being floated stern-first from the ramp. She was subsequently towed to Anacortes for dry-dock repairs. As a result, Lindblad cancelled two scheduled sailings in July 2017.

National Geographic Quest commenced her maiden voyage from Juneau on July 29, 2017.

== Specifications and features ==
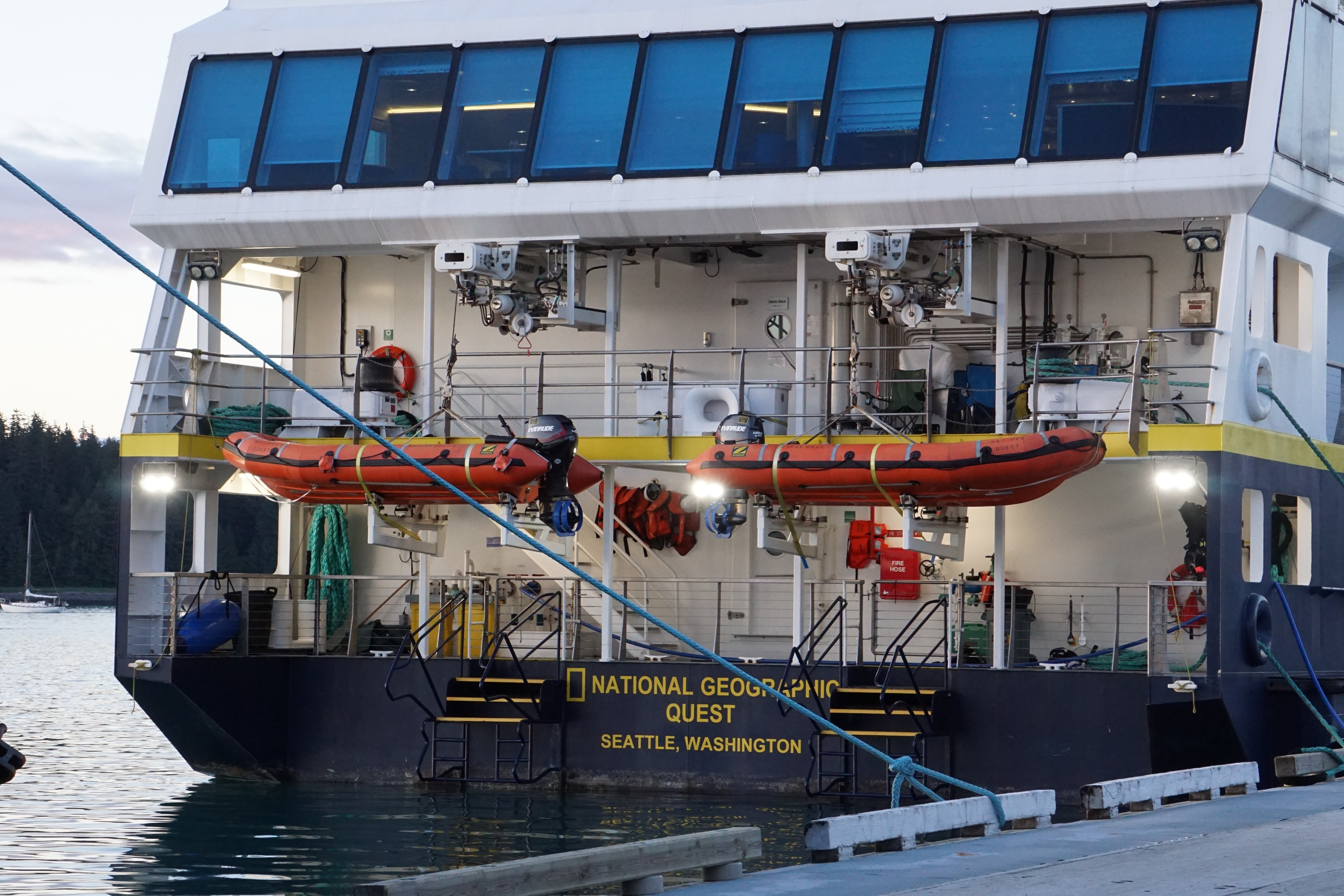
Rigid inflatable boats on the stern of the National Geographic Quest

National Geographic Quest measures approximately 72.69 meters (238 ft 6 in) in overall length with a beam of 13 meters (44 ft) and a draft of 3.7 meters (12 ft). The vessel has 50 cabins, accommodates up to 100 guests, and carries a crew of 52.

Public spaces include a dining room, lounge and presentation facilities, a fitness center, spa, and observation areas. The vessel is equipped with expedition equipment including rigid inflatable boats, kayaks, and stand-up paddleboards, as well as scientific and photographic tools such as a remotely operated vehicle (ROV), hydrophone, and underwater cameras.

Because the vessel was built in the United States, flies the U.S. flag, and is owned by a U.S. company, it is compliant with the Jones Act when crewed by U.S. citizens or permanent residents. This allows the ship to operate voyages entirely within the United States without requiring a foreign port call.
