= Trobriand Islands =

Papua New Guinea, Oceania

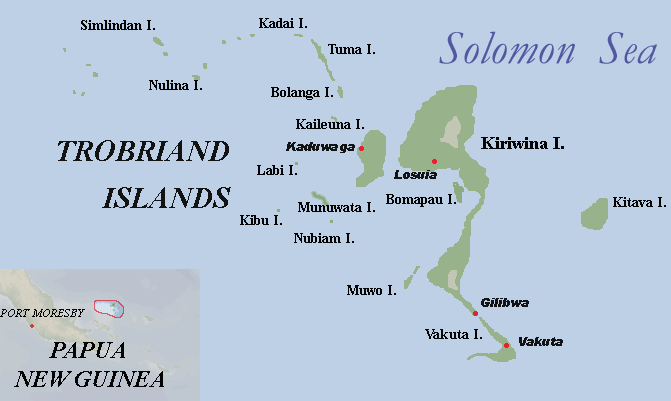
- The Trobriand Islands

- Location within Papua New Guinea

Geography
- Location: Solomon Sea
- Coordinates: 8°40′S 150°55′E
- Area: 450 km^{2} (170 sq mi)

Administration
- Papua New Guinea
- Province: Milne Bay
- Largest settlement: Losuia

Demographics
- Population: 60,000 (2016)

The Trobriand Islands are a 450-square-kilometre (174-square-mile) archipelago of coral atolls off the east coast of New Guinea. They are part of the nation of Papua New Guinea and are in Milne Bay Province. Most of the population of 60,000 (2016) indigenous inhabitants live on the main island of Kiriwina, which is also the location of the government station, Losuia.

Other major islands in the group are Kaileuna, Vakuta, and Kitava. The group is considered to be an important tropical rainforest ecoregion in need of conservation.

== Geography ==
The Trobriands consist of four main islands: Kiriwina—the largest—and Kaileuna, Vakuta, and Kitava. Kiriwina is 43 kilometres (27 miles) long, and varies in width from 1 to 16 kilometres (0.62 to 9.94 mi). In the 1980s, there were around 60 villages on the island, containing around 12,000 people, while the other islands were restricted to a population of hundreds. Other than some elevation on Kiriwina, the islands are flat coral atolls and "remain hot and humid throughout the year, with frequent rainfall."

== History ==
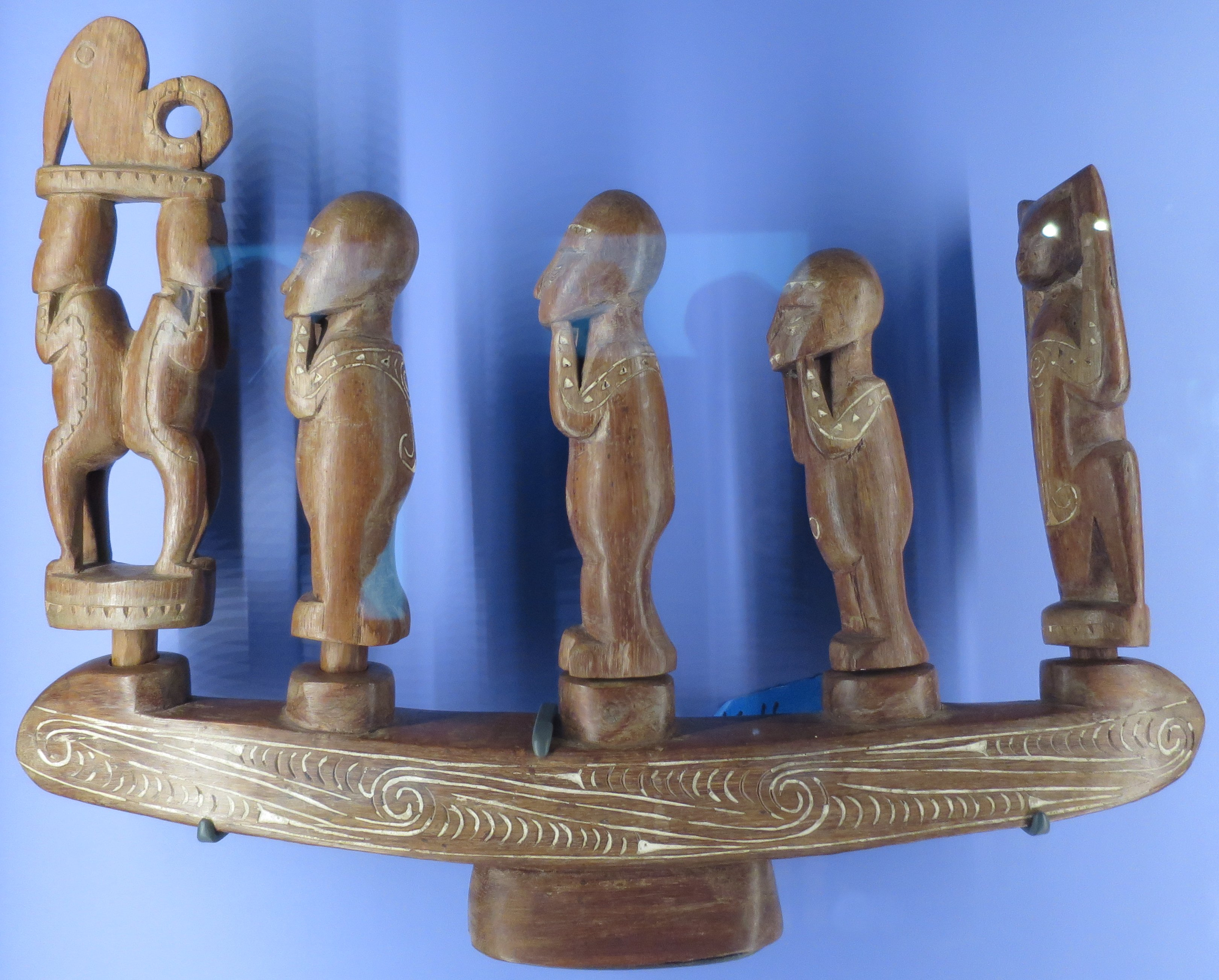
Soul boat, Kiriwina, Trobriand Islands (wood and white lime)

The first European visitor to the islands was the French ship Espérance in 1793. The ship's navigator, Antoine Bruni d'Entrecasteaux, named them after his first lieutenant, Denis de Trobriand.

Whaling ships called at the islands for food, water, and wood in the 1850s and 1860s.

The first Europeans to settle in the Trobriand islands were a Methodist minister, Samuel Benjamin Fellows, and his wife Sarah Margaret Fellows, who moved to Kiriwina in 1894. They were followed a decade later by colonial officers from Australia who set up a governmental station nearby, and soon foreign traders began to set up a small colony on the island. In the 1930s, the Sacred Heart Catholic Mission set up a settlement containing a primary school nearby. It was following this European colonisation that the name "Trobriand" was legally adopted for this group of islands.

The first anthropologist to study the Trobrianders was C. G. Seligman, who focused on the Massim people of mainland New Guinea. Seligman was followed a number of years later by his student, Bronisław Malinowski, who visited the islands during the First World War. Despite being a citizen of the Austro-Hungarian empire, which was at war with Australia, which then controlled the Trobriand Islands, he was allowed to stay (provided he checked in with authorities every now and then). His descriptions of the kula exchange system, gardening, magic, and sexual practices—all classics of modern anthropological writing—prompted many foreign researchers to visit the societies of the island group and study other aspects of their cultures. The psychoanalyst Wilhelm Reich drew on Malinowski's studies of the islands in writing The Invasion of Compulsory Sex Morality and in developing his theory of sex economy in his 1936 work Die Sexualität im Kulturkampf.

In 1943, Allied troops landed on the islands as a part of Operation Cartwheel, the Allied advance to Rabaul.

In the 1970s, some indigenous peoples formed anti-colonial associations and political movements.

In October 2022, tribal fighting broke out on Kiriwina between the Kulumata and Kuboma people, reportedly triggered by a death during fighting at a football match. At least 30 people died. While fights between different groups were not uncommon, this was the first time they had resulted in a large number of deaths.

== Trobriand Islands in the modern day ==
=== Growing population ===
Since 1975, the government of Papua New Guinea has had political control of the island, and its population has expanded quickly. More land has been cleared to accommodate the increasing population. Environmental problems, such as deforestation, are affecting the islands. The government often sends social workers to increase the use of birth control and contraception, but the Trobrianders are not receptive to outside influences dictating their reproductive norms. This means that sex is "the most natural thing in the culture". Another effect of Trobriand promiscuity is the rapid spread of HIV/AIDS caused by foreigners on the island. The first documented case of HIV/AIDS was reported in 2001. HIV has become a major health problem. Since young Trobrianders often have multiple sexual partners before marriage, it is hard to slow the spread of the disease. "The moralistic tropes of risk and promiscuity that dominate the language of HIV prevention are not easily accommodated by Trobriand ideations of sexuality, which celebrate premarital sexual activity as healthy and life-affirming, and which stress the productive values of reciprocity and relations of difference."

=== Income inequality ===
After statehood in 1975, the Trobriand Islands' economy was restructured to fit a tourist and export market. Most Trobrianders live on less than one dollar a day. Since food has been traditionally distributed among the people based on need, there has been little need for a currency-based economy outside of the Kula rings. To counteract this lack of hard currency, several Western goods stores have opened on the islands and created most of the foreign goods market. These stores are multimillion-dollar enterprises. Most Trobrianders struggle to buy goods from these stores because they take only cash. Due to this practice, there are often reports of unrest because of a lack of funds. One remedy that many islanders seek is to sell cultural artifacts and relics to tourists in exchange for their currency. For example, a worker can spend 10 days working on a ceremonial turtle bowl and only get paid $10. "This commercialization is often done sanctimoniously." "They protect their cultural identity and use it as a tourist commodity". One imported item that causes economic and social problems is betel nuts. They are a major narcotic on the island. Due to this new currency-based economy there is more reported crime on the islands. There is a great economic disparity due to the income inequality between the modern world and the Trobriands.

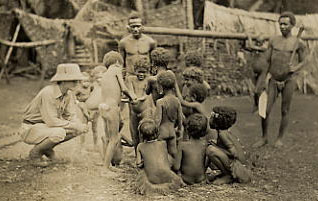
Early education on the islands featuring Malinowski

=== Education ===
In addition to missionary schools, there are public schools on the Trobriands that were introduced by the government of Papua New Guinea. "All children are required to go to school". The required subjects are English, maths, science, and culture. Schools also educate students about current international events. Maths is the favorite subject among the students of the island. On Wednesdays, children are required to dress in traditional garb as part of the government-mandated culture day and encouraged to explore Trobriand culture, history and values.

=== Malinowski's plaque in Kiriwina ===
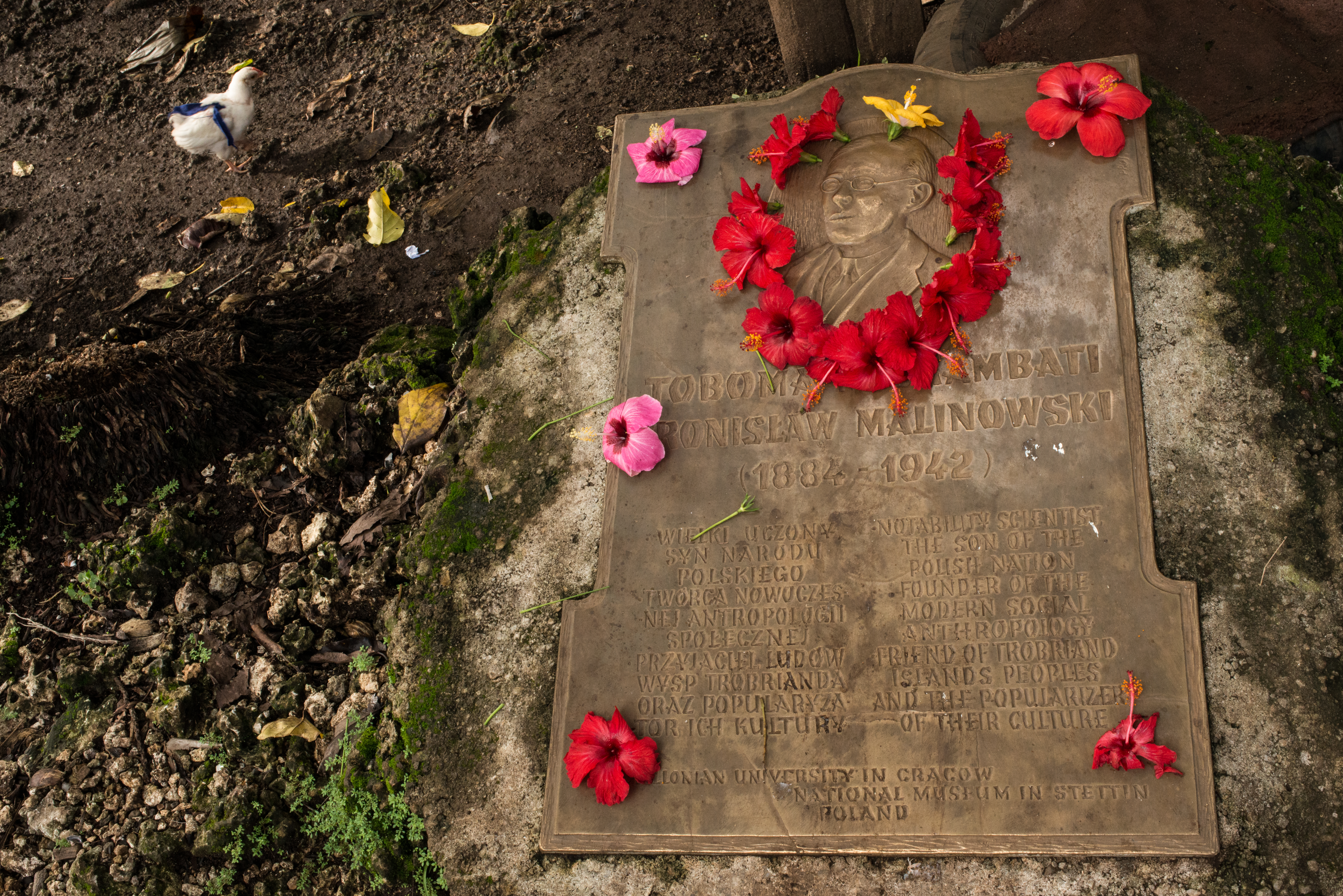
A plaque dedicated to Bronisław Malinowski in Omarakana, decorated by village children

There is a commemorative plaque dedicated to Bronisław Malinowski in Omarakana village, the residence village of the Paramount Chief of Trobriand Islands. The current chief, Pulayasi Daniel, says it is in the place where Malinowski's tent stood at the beginning of the 20th century. There are two inscriptions on it, one in Polish and one in English, that say: "Toboma Miskabati Bronislaw Malinowski (1884–1942) Notable scientist The son of the Polish nation Father of the modern social anthropology Friend of Trobriand Islands peoples and the populizer of their culture". The plaque was brought to Kiriwina by sailors Monika Bronicka and Mariusz Delgas, who took it from New Zealand, where it was left by two other yachts: Maria and Victoria. The plaque was sponsored by Jagiellonian University in Kraków and the National Museum in Szczecin, Poland.

=== Tourism and artist visits ===
The Trobriand Islands are South Sea islands that have so far been little developed for tourism. In 2012 the German painter Ingo Kühl made studies on the kula culture in Kiriwina and Port Moresby.

=== Calendar ===
The Trobriand Islands have a unique lunar calendar system. There are 12 or 13 lunar cycles, but only 10 are fixed: the others constitute free time. The calendar year begins with the sighting of a worm that appears to spawn, which initiates the Milamak festival. The concept of time on the islands is not linear, and the language has only one tense.

== Anthropological studies and pop culture references ==
=== Books by Malinowski about the Trobriands ===
- Argonauts of the Western Pacific (1922)
- The Sexual Life of Savages in North-Western Melanesia (1929)
- Coral Gardens and their Magic (1935)

=== Other books about the Trobriands ===
- The Trobrianders of Papua New Guinea (1988) by Annette B. Weiner
- The Happy Isles Of Oceania (1992) by Paul Theroux
- Women of value, men of renown (1994) by Annette B. Weiner
- The Trobiand Islanders' Way of Speaking (2010) by Gunter Senft
- Islands of Love, Islands of Risk: Culture and HIV in the Trobriands (2012) by Katherine Lepani
- MacCarthy, Michelle (2012). Playing Politics with Yams: Food Security in the Trobriand Islands of Papua New Guinea. Culture, Agriculture, Food & Environment, 34(2), 136-147. doi:10.1111/j.2153-9561.2012.01073.x
- Making the Modern Primitive: Cultural Tourism in the Trobriand Islands (2016) by Michelle MacCarthy
- Connelly, Andrew James, (2007). Counting coconuts : patrol reports from the Trobriand Islands Territory of Papua, 1907-1934. Sacramento, Calif.: California State University. OCLC Number: 317867984.
- Trees, Knots, and Outriggers: Environmental Knowledge in the Northeast Kula Ring (2017) by Frederick Damon
- Ways of Baloma: Rethinking Magic and Kinship from the Trobriands (2017) by Mark Mosko

=== Trobriand Islands in popular culture ===
- The Trobriand Islands were featured in The Young Indiana Jones Chronicles in the episode "Treasure of the Peacock's Eye" when Indy and his friend Remy were marooned there and met Bronisław Malinowski.
- The Trobriand Islands were mentioned in an episode of Married... With Children when Bud Bundy was studying them for an anthropology final.
- The Trobriand Islands were featured in an episode of Worlds Apart on National Geographic Channel
- The Trobriand Islands and the Trobrianders' sexual mores are mentioned in the book Brave New World by Aldous Huxley as the basis for the sexual morality that exists in the book's dystopian society.
- The Trobriand Islands are mentioned in the movie Circle of Friends.
- The Trobriand Islands are mentioned in the paranormal romance novel The Werewolf in the North Woods by Vicki Lewis Thompson.
- The Trobriand Islands are mentioned in the human sexuality book Sex at Dawn by Christopher Ryan and Cacilda Jethá.
- The Trobriand Islands are mentioned in Ian McEwan's 2019 novel Machines Like Me.
- The Trobriand Islands are mentioned in Malcolm Gladwell's 2019 narrative nonfiction book Talking to Strangers.
- In Gore Vidal's book Myra Breckinridge, Myra says she destroyed the elite of the Tobriand island. The implication is that she is so sexually provocative and liberated that she can destroy an already sexually free nation.
- The Trobriand Islands are the setting for the novel The Visitants by Randolph Stow. Stow spent time in the Trobriands as a cadet patrol officer in the late 1950s.
- The island was the location of the film In a Savage Land (1999).
- Trobiand islanders are mentioned in William Gibson's novel Neuromancer (1984) in the context of seashell currency.

== See also ==
- Trobriand cricket
