= Lindblad Expeditions =

American cruise line

Lindblad Expeditions Holdings Inc.
- Formerly: Special Expeditions (1979–2000)
- Type: Public
- Traded as: Nasdaq: LIND
- Industry: Tourism
- Founded: 1979
- Founder: Sven-Olof Lindblad
- Headquarters: New York, New York, U.S.
- Area served: Worldwide
- Key people: Natalya Leahy (CEO); Sven-Olof Lindblad (Co‑chairman); Mark Ein (Co‑chairman)
- Revenue: ▲US$644.7 million (2024)
- Operating income: ▲US$21.6 million (2024)
- Net income: ▼US$35.8 million (2024)
- Total assets: ▲US$876.9 million (2024)
- Total equity: ▲US$253.1 million (2024)
- Number of employees: 1,300 (2024)
- Website: expeditions.com
- Footnotes; Financials as of December 31, 2024. References

Lindblad Expeditions Holdings Inc. is an American expedition travel company headquartered in New York City. Founded in 1979 as Special Expeditions by Sven-Olof Lindblad, the company operates a fleet of 12 small ships, carrying between 28 and 150 guests, and offers expedition cruises to destinations on all seven continents in partnership with National Geographic.

== History ==
=== Lindblad Travel (1958–1989) ===
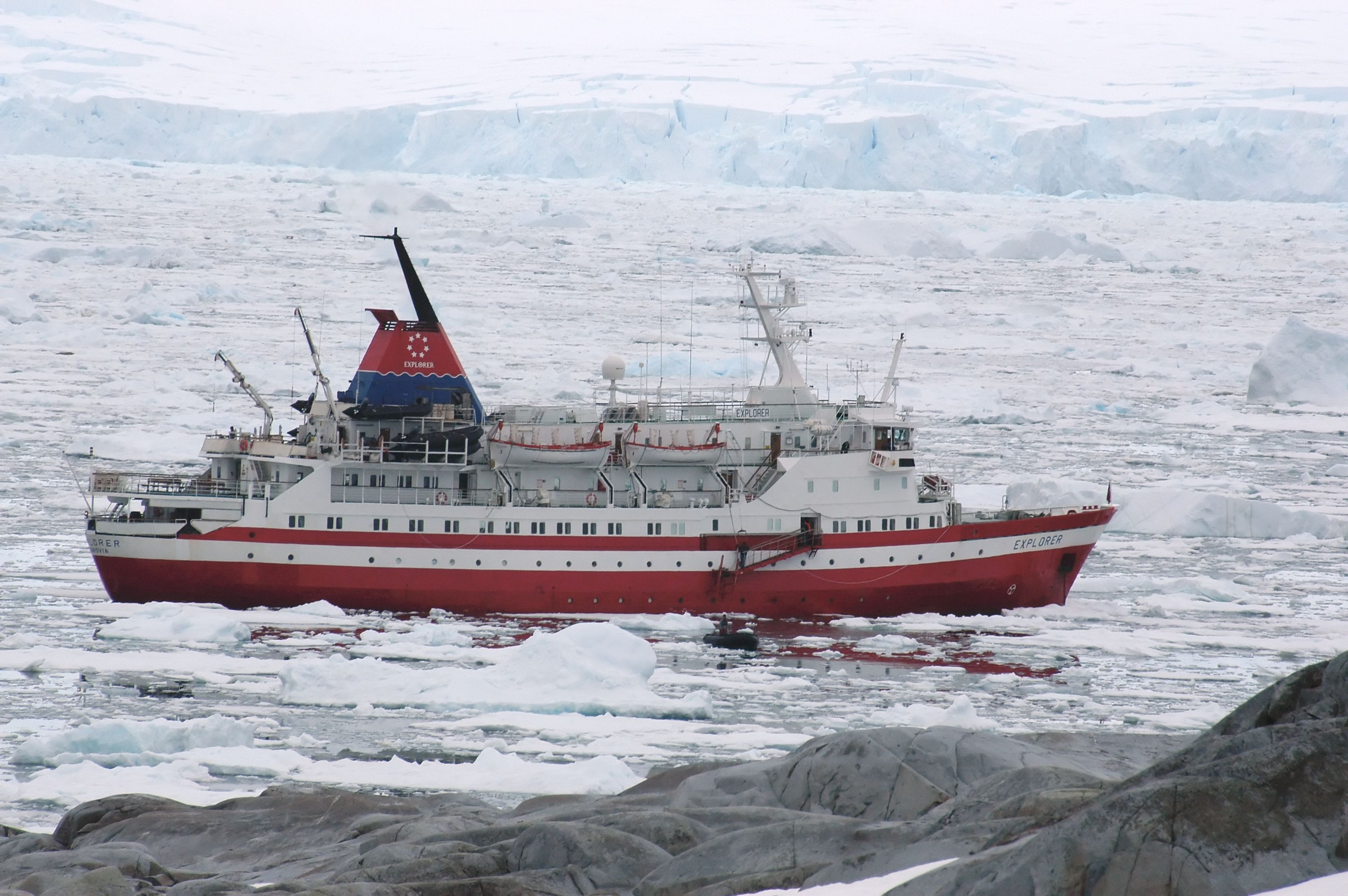
MS Lindblad Explorer in Antarctic waters

Lars-Eric Lindblad founded Lindblad Travel in Connecticut in 1958. Lindblad Travel led the first tourist expedition to Antarctica in 1966 and was among the first companies to bring tourists to the Galápagos Islands starting in 1967. Later, after launching the first private, purpose-built expedition ship, the Lindblad Explorer, it pioneered tourist expeditions to the Arctic, Tierra del Fuego, the Falkland Islands, the Seychelles, Easter Island, Indonesia, the Amazon River, and many others. In 1984 Lindblad Travel led the first tourist expedition through the Northwest Passage from Newfoundland to the Bering Strait.

Regarded as the father of ecotourism, Lars-Eric Lindblad believed strongly that travel to difficult-to-reach places encouraged a desire to preserve and protect the planet. In addition to leading expeditions in remote wilderness areas, Lindblad Travel also led trips to hard-to-visit countries such as China, Vietnam, and Cambodia. The company ceased operations in 1989.

=== Special Expeditions (1979–2003) ===
Lars-Eric Lindblad passed along his passion for adventure, exploration, and conservation to his son, Sven-Olof Lindblad, who joined him on expeditions from an early age. In 1979 Sven-Olof Lindblad founded Special Expeditions as a subsidiary of Lindblad Travel. Special Expeditions decoupled from Lindblad Travel in 1982 and was renamed Lindblad Expeditions in 2000.

=== National Geographic partnership (after 2004) ===
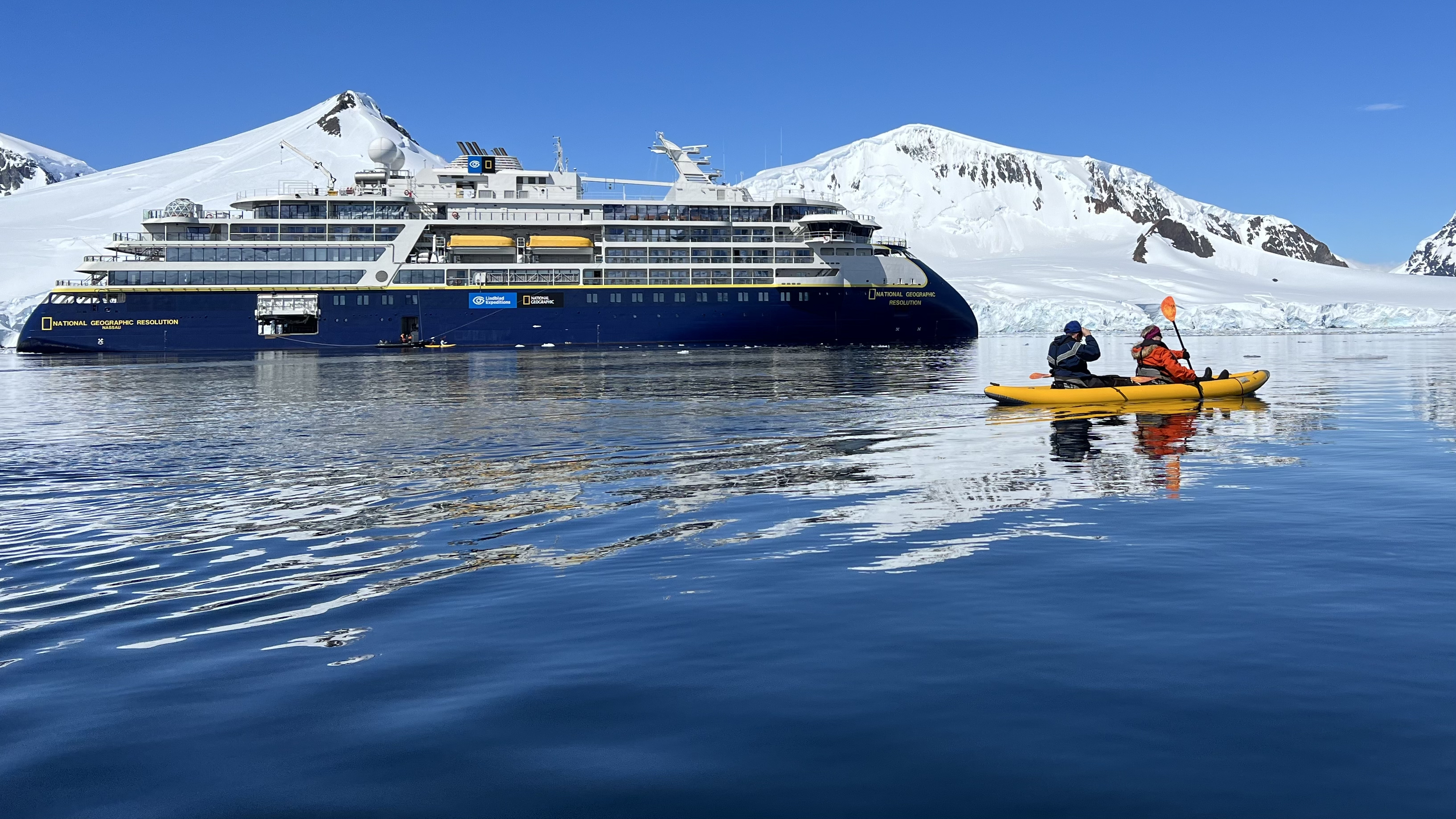
National Geographic Resolution in Antarctic waters

Since 2004, Lindblad Expeditions has partnered with National Geographic, operating under the co-brand Lindblad Expeditions–National Geographic. The partnership integrates Lindblad expedition staff with National Geographic scientists and media personnel, and company vessels carry the "National Geographic" name. Lindblad-operated itineraries are also sold through National Geographic Expeditions. In November 2023, the companies extended their agreement through 2040, following The Walt Disney Company’s acquisition of National Geographic Partners. The renewal expanded Lindblad's marketing access across Disney's portfolio, including Disney Cruise Line and Disney Vacation Club, and permits development of co-branded river cruises and potential larger vessels (295–530 passengers).

The company expanded its fleet in the 2010s. In 2013, it acquired Orion Expedition Cruises and renamed its vessel National Geographic Orion. It ordered its first purpose-built ships in 2015: National Geographic Quest and National Geographic Venture, U.S.-flagged vessels launched in 2017 and 2018 for domestic service. They were followed by National Geographic Endurance (2020) and National Geographic Resolution (2021), which primarily operate in the Arctic and Antarctic regions.

Lindblad also expanded into land-based travel. In 2016, it acquired a controlling interest in Natural Habitat Adventures. In 2021, it acquired Off the Beaten Path, DuVine, and Classic Journeys. The company acquired Thomson Safaris for approximately US$30 million in 2024. These brands continue to operate independently.

Lindblad Expeditions went public in July 2015.

Sven Lindblad retired as CEO in 2021. Dolf Berle was appointed CEO later that year, stepped down in 2023, and was succeeded again by Lindblad. In December 2024, the company announced that Lindblad would step down again and become co-chair of the Board, with Natalya Leahy appointed CEO effective January 1, 2025.

In March 2026, Lindblad Expeditions acquired an additional 5% interest in Natural Habitat from its founder, Ben Bressler, for approximately $16.6 million, increasing its ownership of the company to 95%.

In September 2026, Lindblad acquired a 60% controlling interest in White Desert, PNR Airways, and Echo Charlie for approximately $61 million, plus approximately $6 million for cash on the balance sheet. White Desert operates luxury Antarctic expeditions, including air-based journeys to the interior of Antarctica, while Echo Charlie provides aviation-based experiential travel. Lindblad has options to acquire the remaining interests in the businesses in 2030 and 2031.

== Sustainability and charitable initiatives ==
Lindblad Expeditions operates programs supporting conservation, research, and sustainability. The company established the Galápagos Conservation Fund to support local projects and research, and introduced OPUS (Operation to Prevent Unwanted Species) to reduce the risk of introducing invasive species via imported food. Its Lindblad Expeditions–National Geographic Fund supports research and education initiatives, including student scholarships in the Galápagos and scientific studies such as Antarctic killer whale tagging. In 2019, the company announced plans to achieve carbon neutrality and, in conjunction with National Geographic's "Planet or Plastic" campaign, banned single-use plastics aboard its ships.

== Fleet ==
Lindblad Expedition currently owns and operates a fleet of 12 vessels, which it supplements with chartered vessels.

| Ship | Built | Capacity | Primary Areas of Operation | Flag | Notes | Image |
|---|---|---|---|---|---|---|
| National Geographic Delfina | 2007 | 16 | Galápagos | Ecuador | Previously Celebrity Xploration | |
| National Geographic Endeavour II | 2005 | 96 | Galápagos | Ecuador | Previously Via Australis | |
| National Geographic Endurance | 2020 | 138 | Arctic, Antarctic, Greenland, Iceland, Northwest Passage, Norway | The Bahamas | | |
| National Geographic Explorer | 1982 | 148 | Antarctic, Arctic, Canada, Europe, Patagonia, South America | The Bahamas | Previously Midnatsol (1982–2003); Midnatsol II (2003–2005); Lyngen (2005–2008) | |
| National Geographic Gemini | 2001 | 48 | Galápagos | Ecuador | Previously MS Xpedition | |
| National Geographic Islander II | 1991 | 48 | Galápagos | Ecuador | Previously Crystal Esprit | |
| National Geographic Orion | 2003 | 102 | Asia, South Pacific | The Bahamas | Previously MS Orion; MV Orion | |
| National Geographic Quest | 2017 | 100 | Alaska, California Coast, Canada, Costa Rica, Pacific Northwest, Panama | United States | Lindblad's first-ever new-build vessel. | |
| National Geographic Resolution | 2021 | 138 | Antarctic, Arctic, Greenland, Iceland, Northwest Passage, Norway, Patagonia | The Bahamas | | |
| National Geographic Sea Bird | 1981 | 62 | Alaska, Baja California, Pacific Northwest | United States | To be retired in 2027. | |
| National Geographic Sea Lion | 1982 | 62 | Alaska, Baja California, Belize, Pacific Northwest | United States | To be retired in 2027. | |
| National Geographic Venture | 2018 | 100 | Alaska, Baja California, California Coast | United States | | |
