= National Geographic Orion =

Expedition cruise ship built in 2003

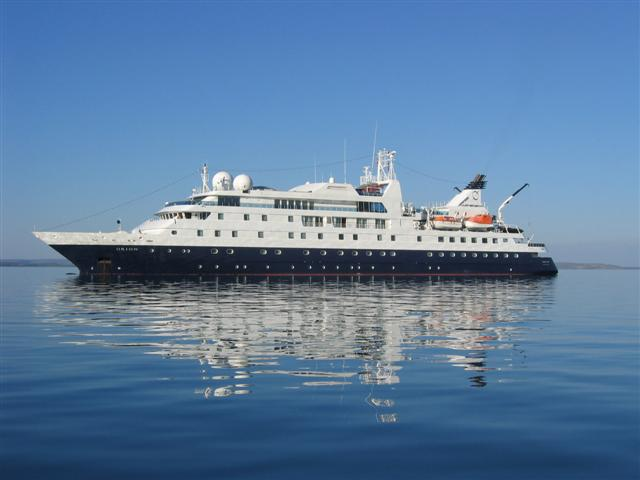
- MV Orion in Kuri Bay, Australia

History

The Bahamas
- Name: National Geographic Orion (since 2014); MV Orion (2003–2014)
- Owner: 2003–2008: Explorer Maritime; 2008–2014: Orion Expedition Cruises; 2014–present: Lindblad Expeditions
- Operator: 2003–2005: Travel Dynamics International; 2005–2014: Orion Expedition Cruises; 2014–present: Lindblad Expeditions
- Port of registry: Nassau, Bahamas
- Builder: Cassens Werft (Emden, Germany)
- Yard number: 30236
- Maiden voyage: November 2003
- Identification: IMO number: 9273076; MMSI number: 311603000; Call sign: C6TE3
- Status: In service

General characteristics
- Type: Expedition ship
- Tonnage: 4,050 GT; 650 DWT
- Length: 102.7 m (337 ft)
- Beam: 14.25 m (46.8 ft)
- Draft: 3.82 m (12.5 ft)
- Depth: 5.85 m (19.2 ft)
- Decks: 6
- Ice class: ICE-1A/E3
- Installed power: 1 × 8-cylinder MaK diesel engine, 3,265 hp (2,435 kW)
- Propulsion: 1 × controllable pitch propeller, 2.5 m (98 in) diameter; 1 × bow thruster, 400 kW (540 hp); 1 × stern thruster, 325 kW (436 hp)
- Speed: 15.5 kn (28.7 km/h; 17.8 mph)
- Capacity: 102 passengers
- Crew: 76

National Geographic Orion (formerly MS Orion and MV Orion) is an expedition ship with an ice-strengthened hull owned and operated by Lindblad Expeditions. The vessel is registered in The Bahamas and operates primarily in polar and tropical regions.

== History ==
The ship was built in 2003 by Cassens Werft in Emden, Germany, for Explorer Maritime, a Marshall Islands-registered company. Technical management was initially handled by Helios Shipping. The vessel was first operated by Travel Dynamics International, sailing in the Antarctic, the Arctic, the Great Lakes, and the Amazon River.

In 2005, Orion Expedition Cruises (OEC) entered into a long-term lease agreement and took delivery of the ship in Papeete, Tahiti, repositioning it to Australia. OEC developed an expedition cruise program focused on Oceania, including the Kimberley region.

On January 20, 2013, while sailing from Antarctica toward Macquarie Island, the vessel rescued French solo yachtsman Alain Delord in the Southern Ocean, approximately 487 nautical miles (902 km; 560 mi) south-southwest of Hobart. Delord had abandoned his dismasted yacht in heavy seas. The rescue was conducted in challenging weather conditions without injury to passengers or crew.

In March 2013, Lindblad Expeditions announced the acquisition of Orion Expedition Cruises. The vessel was renamed National Geographic Orion in March 2014 and joined Lindblad's fleet of expedition vessels.

On December 27, 2016, the ship experienced a main engine failure approximately 200 nautical miles (370 km; 230 mi) south of the Beagle Channel while en route from the Antarctic Peninsula to Ushuaia, Argentina. There were no injuries. The vessel proceeded using auxiliary power and arrived safely, though subsequent sailings were canceled. In January 2017, the vessel was carried by a heavy-lift ship to a shipyard in the Netherlands to undergo several months of repairs.

== Design and specifications ==
National Geographic Orion was constructed by Cassens Werft in Emden, Germany, as an expedition cruise vessel. The vessel measures 102.7 meters (337 ft) in length overall, with a breadth of 14.25 meters (46.8 ft) and a draft of 3.82 meters (12.5 ft). She has a gross tonnage of 4,050 GT and a deadweight of 650 tonnes (1,430,000 lb). Designed for extended remote operations, the ship has a cruising range of approximately 8,000 nautical miles (15,000 km; 9,200 mi) and a service speed of 15.5 knots (28.7 km/h; 17.8 mph).

The ship is powered by a single 8-cylinder MaK 8M25 diesel main engine producing 3,265 horsepower (2,435 kW) and driving a controllable-pitch propeller 2.5 meters (8 ft 2 in) in diameter. Maneuverability is enhanced by bow and stern thrusters rated at 400 kilowatts (540 hp) and 325 kilowatts (436 hp) respectively. Electrical power is supplied by two 950 kVA diesel alternators, a shaft alternator of 800 kVA, and a 175 kVA emergency generator. Fresh water is produced onboard by two generators capable of producing 35,000 litres (7,700 imp gal; 9,200 US gal) per day each.

The hull is ice-reinforced and classed ICE-1A/E3 by Germanischer Lloyd, enabling operations in polar waters with first-year ice up to 0.8 meters (2 ft 7 in) thick. As an expedition vessel, National Geographic Orion carries a fleet of 14 rigid inflatable boats (Zodiacs) and 24 sea kayaks to facilitate shore landings and exploration in remote regions accompanied by naturalists and photographers affiliated with National Geographic. The vessel also carries scuba gear for up to 24 guests and divemasters, snorkel gear for all guests, a Remotely Operated Vehicle capable of operating of depths up to 304 meters (997 ft), an undersea video camera, a hydrophone, and a video microscope.

== Sister vessels ==
Although National Geographic Orion is a distinct design, two similar but smaller vessels were previously built by Cassens Werft:

- Sun Bay – Launched in 2001, later operated as Celebrity Xpedition by Celebrity Cruises, and subsequently as National Geographic Gemini in the Galápagos Islands.
- Sun Bay II – Launched in 2002; later renamed Corinthian, then Constellation, and subsequently operated as Lauren L.
