= Kaileuna =

Island of Papua New Guinea

Coordinates: 8°31′31″S 150°56′58″E

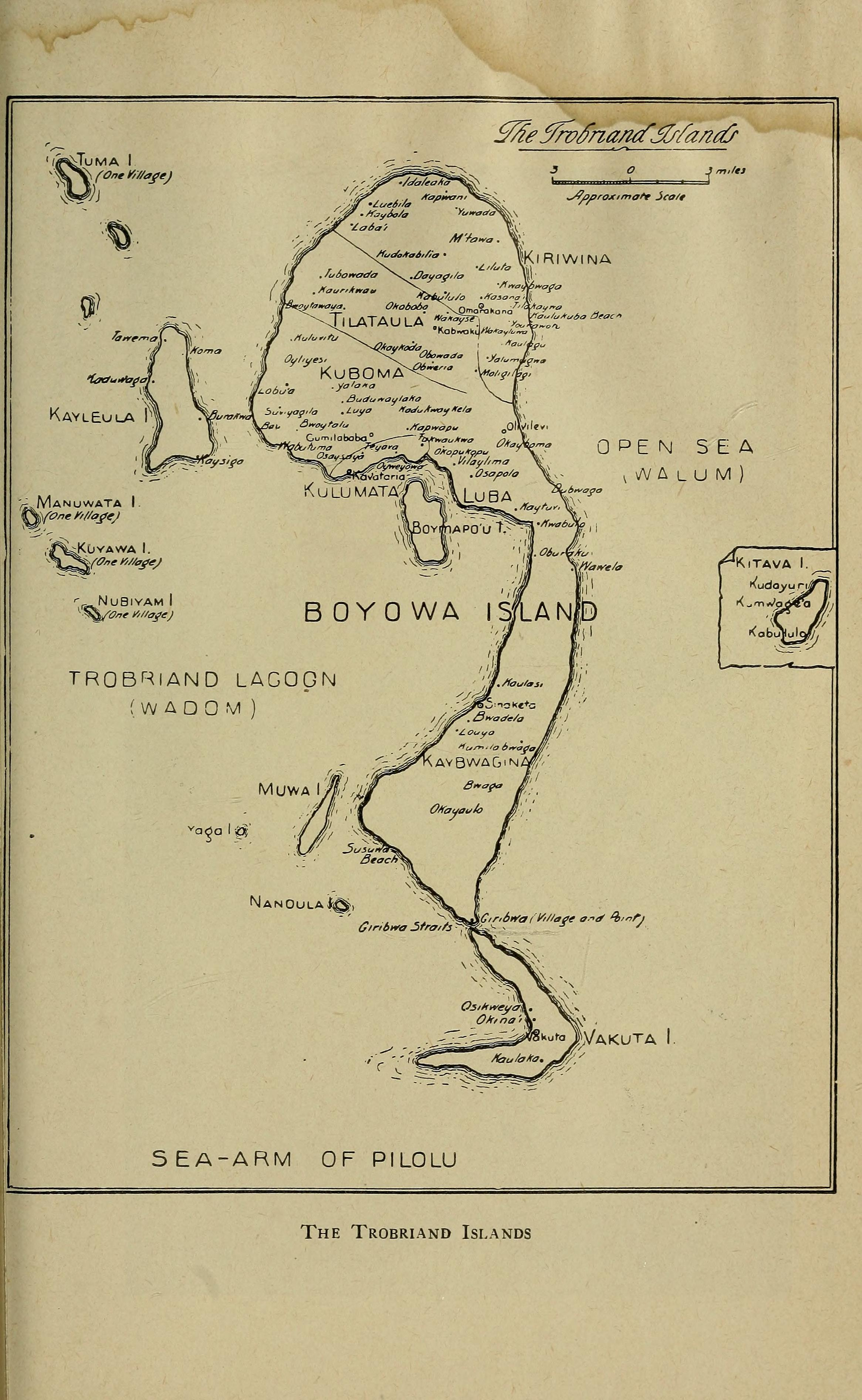
The 1929 map of the Trobriand Islands shows five villages on Kayleuna

Kaileuna (or Kaile'una) is an island in the Solomon Sea in the Trobriand Islands group of the Milne Bay Province of Papua New Guinea (PNG). With an area of 45.53 km^{2}, it is the second-largest island in the group, after Kiriwina, which is situated to its east. The island is surrounded by numerous coral reefs.

There is a swamp in the middle of the island. Two rivers or creeks flow from it: the River Uyanaki joins the sea in the southeast of the island, while the River Ludobu reaches the sea in the island's west. Its estuary is known to be the home of many crocodiles. Freshwater is normally sourced from a number of wells on the island. The Kilivila language spoken on the island differentiates several different soil types. Slash-and-burn agriculture is used, with the main food crop being yam.

As of the census of the population of 2000, there were 1,908 people living on the island, in five villages:

- Kaduwaga (645)
- Kaisiga (409)
- Tawema (352)
- Koma (282)
- Giva (220)

The largest village, Kaduwaga, is on the north-west coast of the island; Kaisiga is on the south coast; Tawema in the north and Koma and Giwa on the east coast. In addition to Kaisiga there are several communities on the south coast, including Bulakwa, Musa and Kapisila, but all the villages in the South of Kaileuna Island are referred to as 'Kaisiga'. In 2015 a Primary School was established at Kaisiga village. There are now three primary schools in Kaileuna, at Kaduwaga, Kaisiga and Kuyawa on nearby Kuyawa (Kuiawa) Island.

The island has been studied by the American cognitive scientist, Edwin Hutchins.

The two main Christian Denominations on Kaileuna are the United Church in Papua New Guinea and Solomon Islands and the Seventh-day Adventist Church (SDA). Except for the Kaisiga villages (Kaisiga, Bulakwa, Kapisila and Musa) the rest of the inhabitants of the Kaileuna Island villages are United Church members. The United churches at Kaileuna Island is referred to as Kaileuna Circuit of Kiriwina United Church.

== Literature ==
- Gunter Senft: Landscape terms and place names in the Trobriand Islands – the Kaile’una subset. In: Language Sciences 30 (2008) 340–361 (online)
