= Silver Origin =

Cruise ship

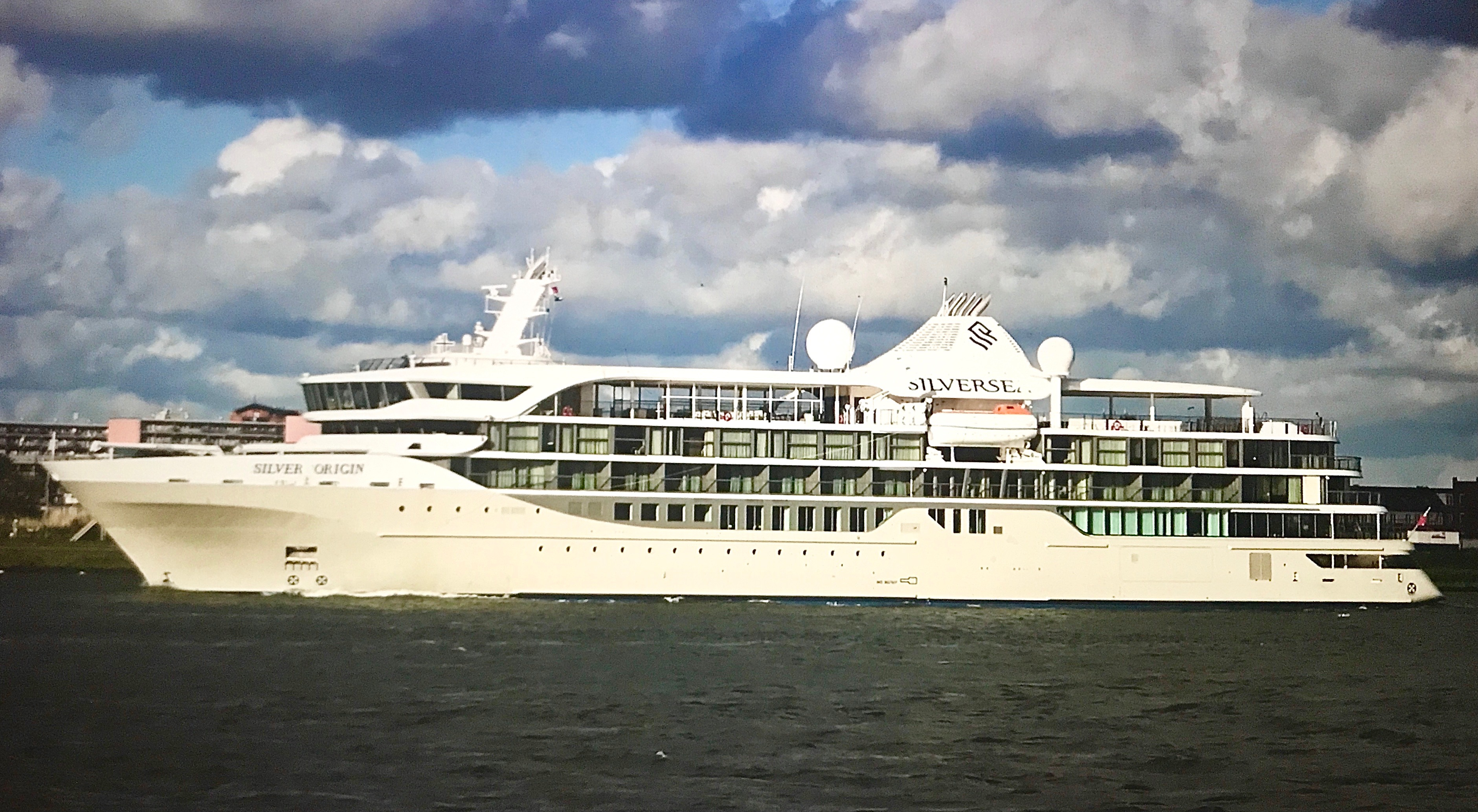
- Silver Origin at Rotterdam

History
- Name: Silver Origin
- Operator: Silversea Cruises
- Port of registry: Ecuador
- Ordered: October 8, 2018
- Builder: Shipyard De Hoop, Netherlands
- Launched: December 30, 2019
- Christened: Johanna Carrion
- Acquired: June 3, 2020
- Identification: IMO number: IMO9837937
- Status: In service

General characteristics
- Type: Cruise ship
- Tonnage: 5,800 GT
- Length: 110 m (360 ft 11 in)
- Beam: 18.92 m (62 ft 1 in)
- Speed: 15 knots (28 km/h; 17 mph)
- Capacity: 102 passengers
- Crew: 87

Silver Origin was the first new purpose-built expedition ship for Silversea Cruises, and was completed in 2020 for the Galápagos cruise market.

== Design and construction ==
The ship was originally intended as a sister ship to Celebrity Flora, named Celebrity Fauna, but was shifted to the Silversea brand and renamed Silver Origin. The ship was ordered on October 8, 2018, and constructed at the Shipyard De Hoop in the Netherlands.

The ship plans were redesigned for the Silversea brand, with the masterplan adapted by Wilson Butler Architects, interior design of public venues by HBA Miami, staterooms by veteran cruise designer GEM, and exterior design by 3Deluxe.

The ship was launched on traditional slipway on December 20, 2019. Heavy rains in January and February 2020 prevented the ship from being able to pass under the bridges for sea trials out of Rotterdam, delaying them by more than a month.

Sea trials took place in April 2020, and the ship was officially delivered on June 3, 2020, in Rotterdam, Netherlands.

The ship would finally be christened upon entering service on February 25, 2022, in Cristobal, Galápagos Islands and named by conservationist Johanna Carrion.
