= Losuia =

Village in Papua New Guinea

Coordinates: 8°32′S 151°03′E

Losuia is a village on Kiriwina Island, part of the Kiriwina Islands, Milne Bay Province, Papua New Guinea. It is served by Losuia Airport.

It is the name of the government station on the Kiriwina island.
