= The Invasion of Compulsory Sex Morality =

The Invasion of Compulsory Sex Morality (original German title Der Einbruch der Sexualmoral) is a book written by Austrian psychoanalyst Wilhelm Reich and published in 1931. The book details Reich's theories of the causes of sexual neuroses, and attempts to explain them in historical, as opposed to Marxist or Freudian terms.

The first two editions (1931 & 1934) were in German - the third edition (1951) was the first to be translated into and published in English, and had a different foreword. In the prefaces to the three editions, Reich discusses not only the book itself, but also events (such as the rise of Nazism) current at the time of publication.

Reich drew heavily on the work of Malinowski, especially his The Sexual Life of Savages in North-Western Melanesia (1929).

In 2015 the book remains in print and is in the collections of hundreds of libraries around the world.
