= National Geographic Delfina =

Luxury catamaran owned by Lindblad Expeditions

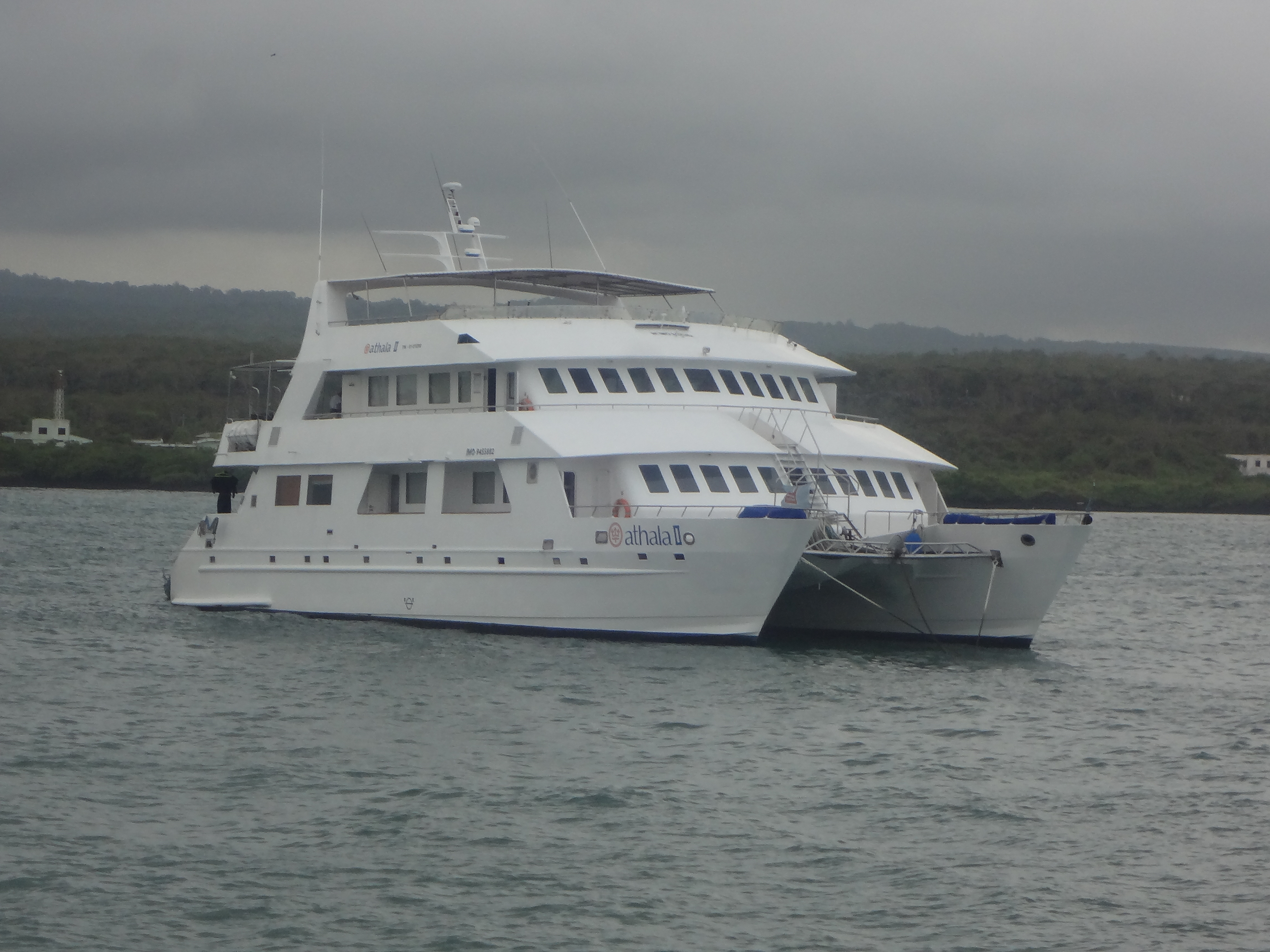
- Vessel in a prior livery anchored at Puerto Ayora

History

Equador
- Name: Athala II (2007–2017); Celebrity Xploration (2017–2025); National Geographic Delfina (2025–present)
- Owner: Ocean Adventures (2007–2017); Royal Caribbean Group (2017–2025); Lindblad Expeditions (2025–present)
- Operator: Ocean Adventures (2007–2017); Celebrity Cruises (2017–2025); Lindblad Expeditions (2025–present)
- Port of registry: Guayaquil, Ecuador
- Builder: Botto Astilleros y Marina (Guayaquil)
- Completed: May 2007
- Identification: IMO number: 9455882; MMSI number: 735057940; Call sign: HC4844
- Status: In service

General characteristics
- Tonnage: 242 GT
- Length: 98 ft (30 m)
- Beam: 37 ft (11 m)
- Decks: 3
- Speed: 10 kn (19 km/h; 12 mph)
- Capacity: 16
- Crew: 12

National Geographic Delfina is a catamaran operated by Lindblad Expeditions for tours in the Galápagos Islands. Built by Botto Astilleros y Marina in Guayaquil, Ecuador, and completed in May 2007, the vessel originally sailed as Athala II for tour operator Ocean Adventures from 2007 to 2017. She later operated as Celebrity Xploration under Celebrity Cruises from 2017 to 2025 before being sold to Lindblad Expeditions and renamed.

Celebrity Xploration began sailings under the Celebrity brand in March 2017. In August 2017, Nathaly Albán was appointed captain, becoming the first woman to captain a cruise ship operating in the Galápagos region.

The vessel has a gross tonnage of 242 GT and accommodates 16 passengers in 8 staterooms. Staterooms include either a private balcony or direct access to an outer deck. Public areas include an observation deck with hot tub, an upper deck with an outdoor café, a main deck dining room, bar, lounge, and library. Onboard equipment includes Zodiacs, kayaks, stand-up paddleboards, and snorkeling gear. The ship operates with two expedition staff who are licensed naturalists, including an Expedition Leader and a National Geographic-certified photo instructor, and offers educational programming for children and teens through the National Geographic Global Explorers program.

National Geographic Delfina sails year-round in the Galápagos Islands, offering itineraries ranging from 10- to 16-day voyages, including combined trips with Peru's Machu Picchu. The vessel is the smallest in the Lindblad Expeditions fleet and is named after the founder Sven-Olof Lindblad's youngest daughter, Delfina.
