= National Geographic Gemini =

Expedition cruise ship built in 2001

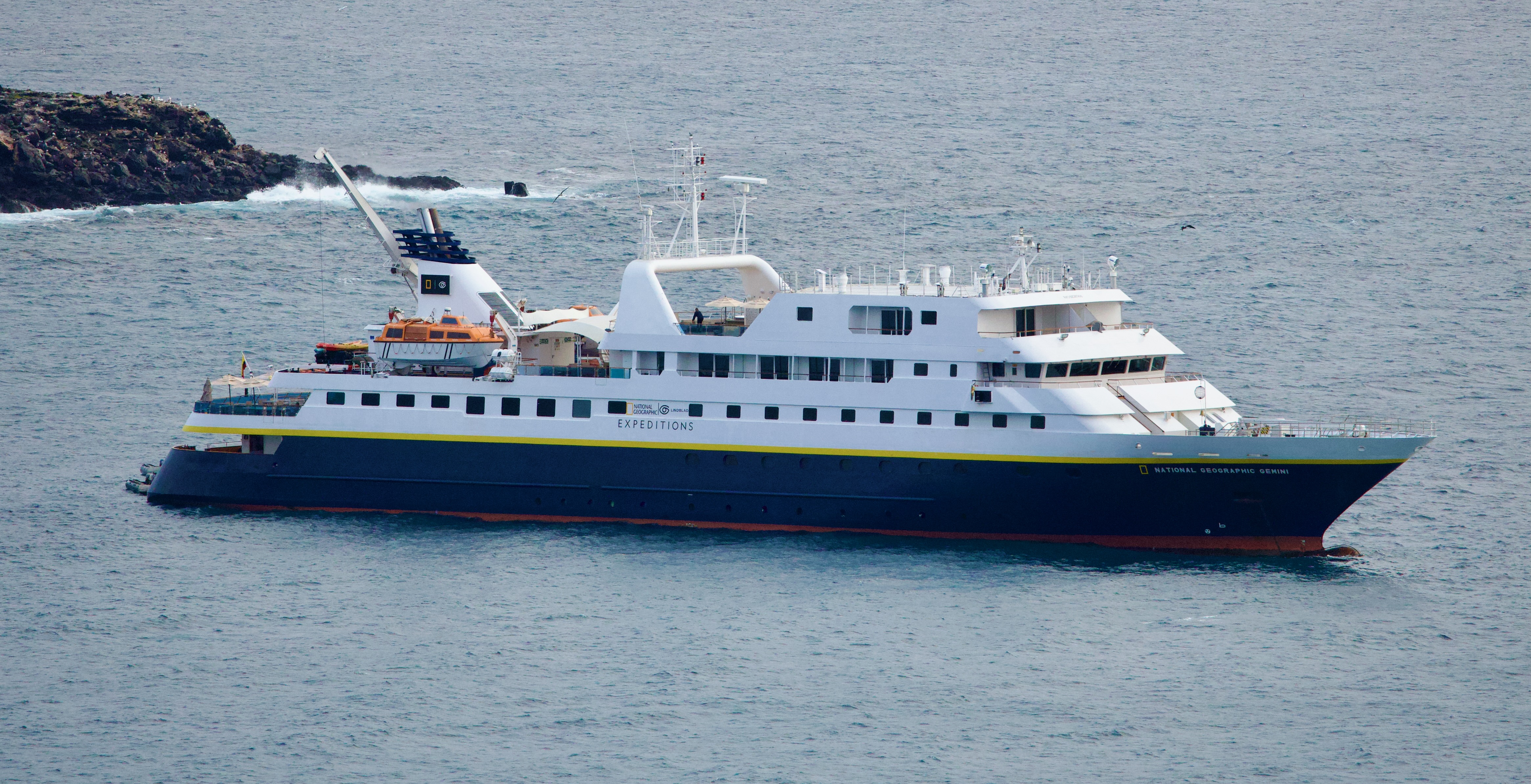
- National Geographic Gemini in the Galápagos Islands, July 2025

History

Ecuador
- Name: National Geographic Gemini (since 2025); Xpedition (2004–2025); Sun Bay (2001–2004)
- Owner: 2001–2004: Sun Bay Cruises; 2004–2025: Royal Caribbean Group; 2025–present: Lindblad Expeditions
- Operator: 2001–2004: Sun Bay Cruises; 2004–2025: Celebrity Cruises; 2025–present: Lindblad Expeditions
- Port of registry: 2001–2003: Nassau, Bahamas; 2003–2004: Valletta, Malta; 2004–present: Guayaquil, Ecuador
- Builder: Cassens Werft (Emden, Germany)
- Yard number: 30228
- Launched: February 17, 2001
- Christened: June 15, 2001
- Completed: June 11, 2001
- Identification: IMO number: 9228368; MMSI number: 735023483; Call sign: HC2083
- Status: In service

General characteristics
- Type: Expedition ship
- Tonnage: 2,937 GT
- Length: 296 ft (90 m)
- Beam: 43 ft (13 m)
- Decks: 6
- Speed: 16 kn (30 km/h; 18 mph)
- Capacity: 48 passengers
- Crew: 57

National Geographic Gemini is an expedition cruise ship operated by Lindblad Expeditions. Built by Cassens Werft in Emden, Germany, the vessel was launched on February 17, 2001, and completed in June that year. She entered service as Sun Bay for Sun Bay Cruises, was renamed Xpedition in 2004 after acquisition by Royal Caribbean Group for operation by Celebrity Cruises, and in 2025 was purchased by Lindblad Expeditions and renamed National Geographic Gemini.

National Geographic Gemini was constructed by Cassens Werft in Emden, Germany, as an expedition cruise vessel. The vessel measures 296 feet (90 m) in length overall, with a beam of 43 feet (13 m). She has a gross tonnage of 2,937 GT and a service speed of approximately 16 knots (30 km/h; 18 mph).

Originally configured to accommodate 96 passengers and 68 crew, the ship underwent a significant refit following her acquisition by Lindblad Expeditions. Passenger capacity was reduced to 48 guests with 57 crew.

Sun Bay had a sister ship, Sun Bay II, later converted to private yacht use and ultimately operated as Lauren L. The larger National Geographic Orion was subsequently built by the same shipyard to a broadly similar design.

The vessel operates year-round itineraries in the Galápagos Islands.

On November 5, 2019, while operating as Celebrity Xpedition, the ship ran aground in the Galápagos Islands. No passengers or crew were injured and no environmental damage was reported.
