= National Geographic Endeavour II =

Ice-strengthened passenger vessel owned by Lindblad Expeditions

History

Ecuador
- Name: Via Australis (2005–2016); National Geographic Endeavour II (2016–present)
- Owner: Australis (2005–2016); Lindblad Expeditions (2016–present)
- Operator: Australis (2005–2016); Lindblad Expeditions (2016–present)
- Port of registry: Guayaquil, Ecuador
- Builder: ASENAV Shipyard (Valdivia, Chile)
- Completed: 2005
- Identification: IMO number: 9334088; MMSI number: 735059655; Call sign: HC-6113
- Status: In service

General characteristics
- Tonnage: 2,716 GT
- Length: 237 ft (72 m)
- Beam: 44 ft (13 m)
- Decks: 5
- Installed power: Cummins 1.3 MW (1,700 hp)
- Speed: 12 knots (22 km/h; 14 mph)
- Capacity: 96

National Geographic Endeavour II is a small ice-strengthened passenger vessel operated by Lindblad Expeditions for tours in the Galápagos Islands. Built by ASENAV Shipyard in Valdivia, Chile, and completed in 2005, the vessel originally sailed as Via Australis for Australis, a Chile-based expedition cruise line sailing Patagonia cruises. The ship sailed for Australis from 2005 to 2016.

The vessel currently sails year around in the Galápagos Islands.

== Facilities ==
The vessel is equipped with a fleet of kayaks and stand-up paddleboards. It also offers a glass-bottom viewing area, snorkeling gear and wetsuits, underwater video camera, video microscopes, and walking sticks for the guests to use. The ship also has a fitness center, global gallery selling handmade local items, a library, a lounge with panoramic windows, and a bar and sun deck.
