= MS National Geographic Explorer =

Cruise ship operated by Lindblad Expeditions

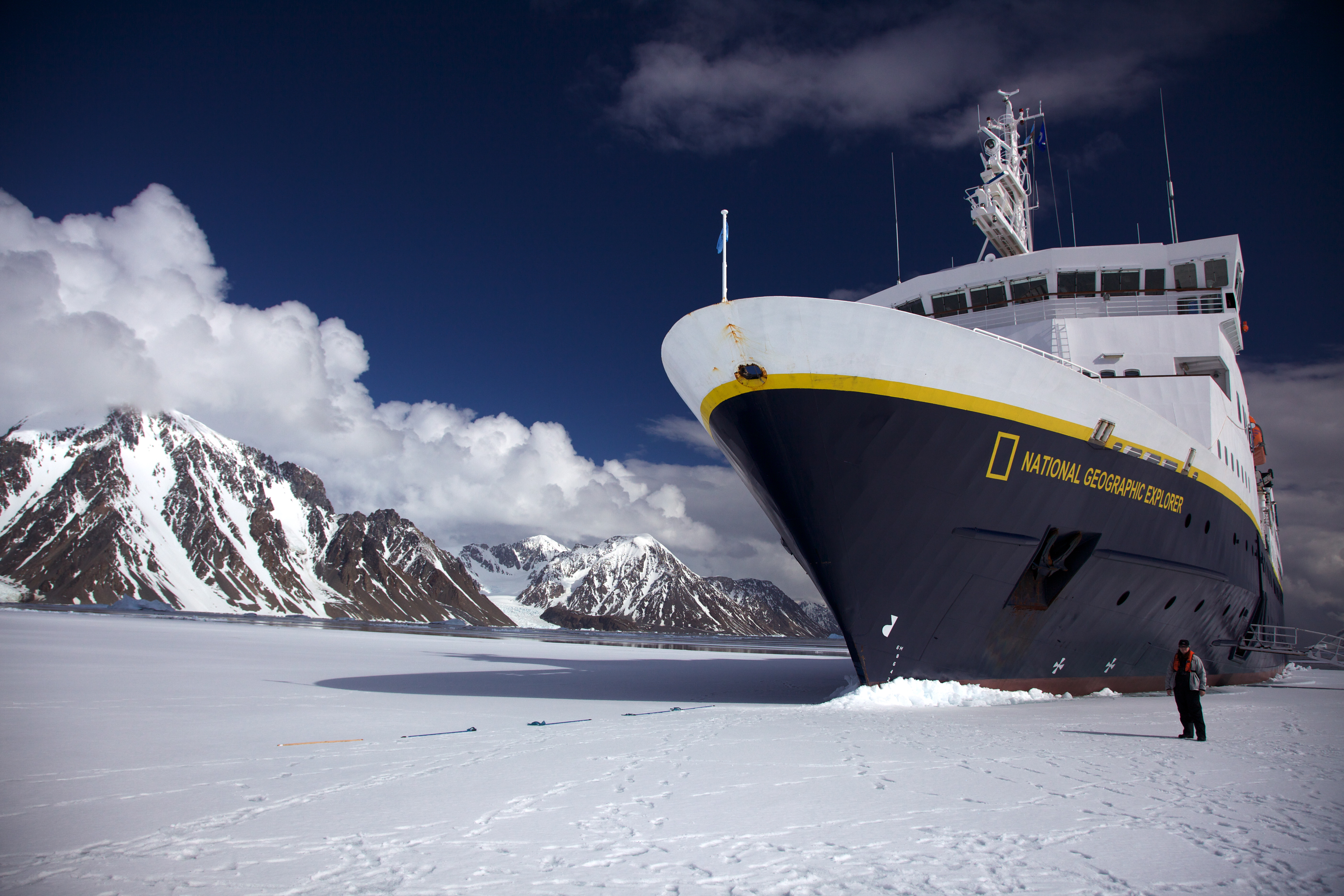
- Cruise ship National Geographic Explorer in fast ice, Antarctica

History

The Bahamas
- Name: Midnatsol (1982–2003); Midnatsol II (2003–2005); Lyngen (2005-2008); National Geographic Explorer (2008–)
- Operator: Lindblad Expeditions
- Port of registry: Nassau, Bahamas
- Route: Antarctic, Arctic
- Ordered: 12/1982
- Builder: Ulstein Verft AS, Norway
- Launched: 22 May 1982
- Identification: Call sign: C6WR2; IMO number: 8019356; MMSI number: 309336000
- Status: In service

General characteristics
- Type: Cruise ship
- Tonnage: 6,471 GT; 1,942 NT
- Length: 112 m (367 ft 5 in)
- Beam: 16.51 m (54 ft 2 in)
- Draft: 4.74 m (15 ft 7 in)
- Decks: 3
- Ice class: 1A
- Installed power: 2 × BMV KVM-16 (2 × 3200 hp)
- Speed: 15.4 knots (28.5 km/h; 17.7 mph)
- Capacity: 148 passengers

National Geographic Explorer is a small ice-strengthened passenger vessel in the Lindblad Expeditions fleet. She can accommodate 148 guests. She was previously operated by Hurtigruten.

The ship frequently follows routes in the Antarctic, Arctic, Norway, Greenland, and Canadian Highlands.

== History ==
For some time since May 3, 2020 the ship was anchored outside of Frederikshavn due to the effects of the COVID-19 pandemic on cruise ships.

== Facilities ==
The ship has educational and entertainment facilities, including a chart room, library, observation lounge, a fleet of 36 kayaks, a remote operated vehicle capable of diving to 1000 feet depth, a fleet of 14 zodiacs, lounge and fitness center.

== Accommodation ==
National Geographic Explorer offers 81 cabins and suites which are all outside facing.
