= CRIST =

CRIST S.A.
- Company type: Spółka akcyjna
- Industry: Shipbuilding
- Founded: 1990
- Headquarters: Gdynia, Poland
- Key people: Krzysztof Kulczycki, Chairman
- Services: Shipbuilding; Ship repair
- Website: www.crist.com.pl

CRIST is a shipyard, located in the Port of Gdynia, Poland.

Founded in 1990 it now mainly produces ships for the offshore industry including wind turbine installation vessels.

CRIST is a shareholder in a joint company with Bilfinger to produce foundations for offshore wind farms.

CRIST built a seabed leveling device for the Fehmarn Belt fixed link.
