= Kiriwina =

Island of Papua New Guinea

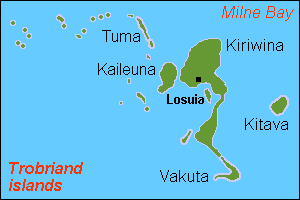
- The Trobriand Islands

- Location within Papua New Guinea

Geography
- Coordinates: 8°40′S 150°55′E
- Archipelago: Trobriand Islands
- Area: 290.5 km^{2} (112.2 sq mi)
- Length: 50 km (31 mi)
- Width: 6.0 km (3.73 mi)
- Highest elevation: 46 m (151 ft)

Administration
- Papua New Guinea

Demographics
- Population: 22,163 (2000)
- Pop. density: 76.42/km^{2} (197.93/sq mi)

Kiriwina is the largest and most populated of the Trobriand Islands, situated in the Solomon Sea, with an area of 290.5 km^{2} (112.2 sq mi). It is part of the Kiriwina-Goodenough District of the Milne Bay Province of Papua New Guinea. Most of the 12,000 people who live in the Trobriands live on Kiriwina. The Kilivila language, also known as Kiriwina, is spoken on the island. The main town is Losuia. The island falls under the administrative division of Kiriwina Rural LLG.

== Geography ==
Kiriwina is a raised atoll 30 miles (48 km) long by 3–10 miles (5–16 km) wide. It is covered largely with swamp, but rises to 100 feet (30 metres) at a central ridge. Yams dominate agricultural production and, in drier areas, the Trobrianders produce yams for export to other islands.

== Anthropology ==
In the early 1900s, Polish anthropologist Bronislaw Malinowski spent several years studying the islands and wrote an ethnographic study, The Sexual Life of Savages in North-Western Melanesia, which gained widespread popularity. His observations of the islanders' seemingly sexually explicit dances and relaxed attitude toward extramarital affairs, particularly manifested during the annual yam harvest, put the Trobriands on the map as "The Islands of Love." His work attracted other anthropologists, other writers such as the American travel writer, Paul Theroux, and men who wanted to experience the sexual freedoms described by Malinowski.

== History ==
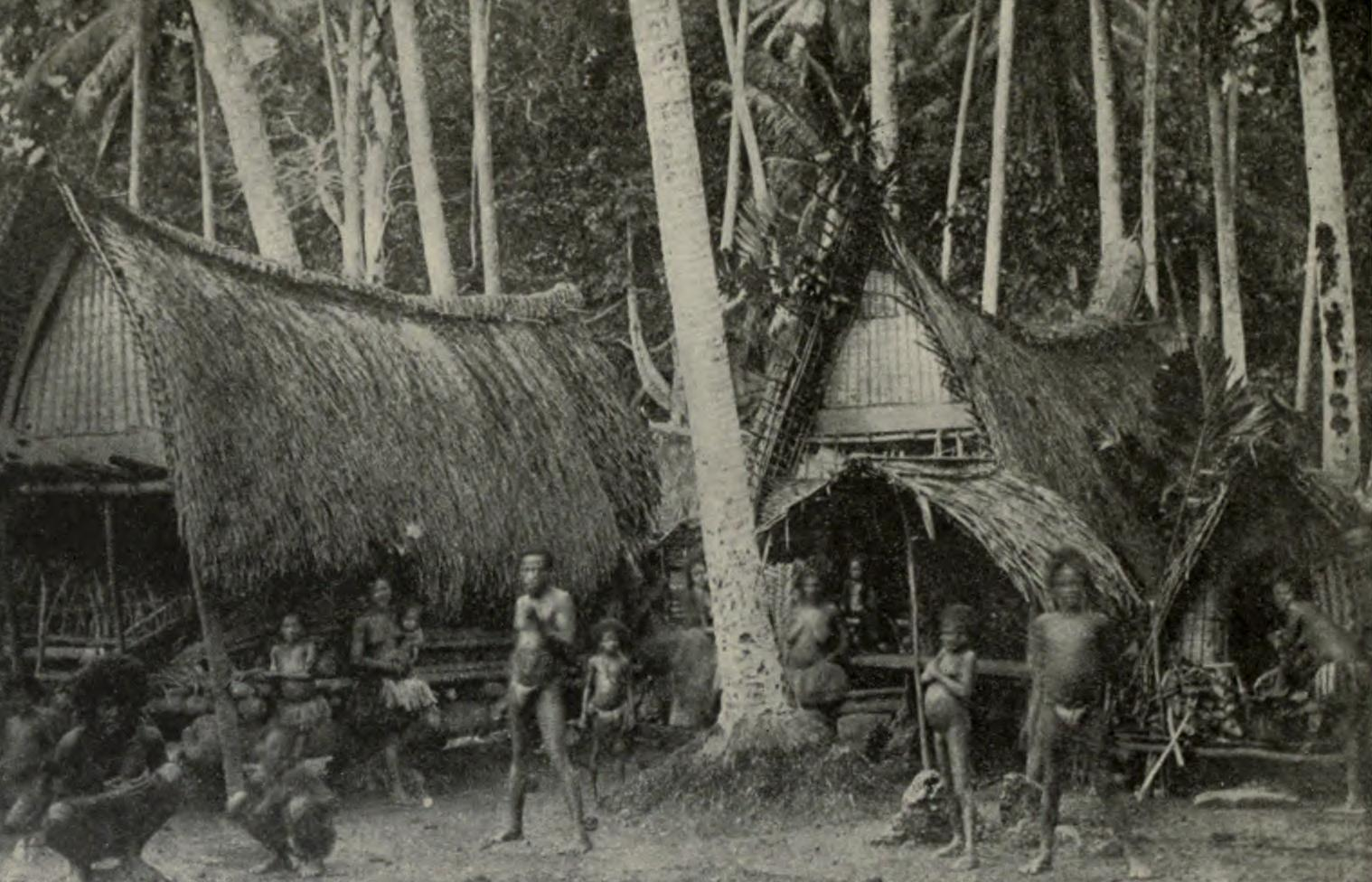
A Kiriwina Village (1899)

Allied forces landed on Kiriwina and Woodlark Island on June 30, 1943 during Operation Chronicle in World War II. Following the landing U.S. Army Engineers supervised construction of Kiriwina Airfield, including a 2,000 metre (6,000 ft) coral-surfaced runway.

"In September 1943, at the request of the 6th Army, 12 officers and 306 men of the 60th Naval Construction Battalion were sent to Kiriwina to assist in the airfield development. The primary task of the Seabees was the construction of two taxiways, one 7,000 feet (2,100 m) long, with 25 fighter hardstands; the other, 5,300 feet (1,600 m) long, with 16 bomber hardstands. The first taxiway was completed on October 12, two days ahead of schedule, in time to support a major air raid against Rabaul. About a week later, the second taxiway was completed." No. 73 Wing RAAF was based at this field in August 1943. A seaplane base was constructed at Losuia, consisting of an anchorage and jetty.

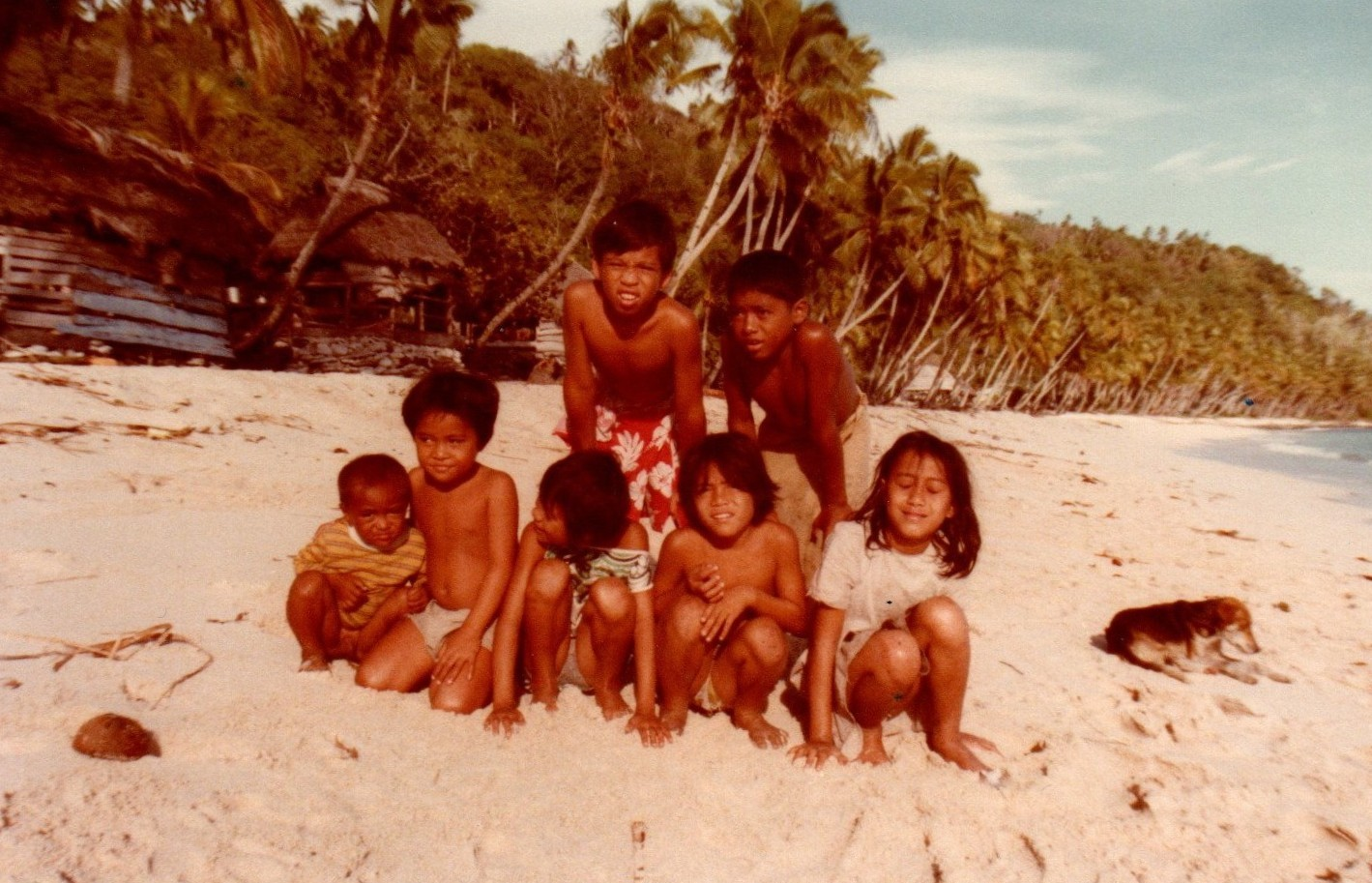
Children on the beach on Kiriwina, c. 1980

=== 21st century ===
In October 2022, tribal fighting broke out on Kiriwina between the Kulumata and Kuboma people, reportedly triggered by a death during fighting at a football match. At least 30 people died. While fights between different groups were not uncommon, this was the first time they had resulted in a large number of deaths.
