= Celebrity Xcel =

Edge-class cruise ship

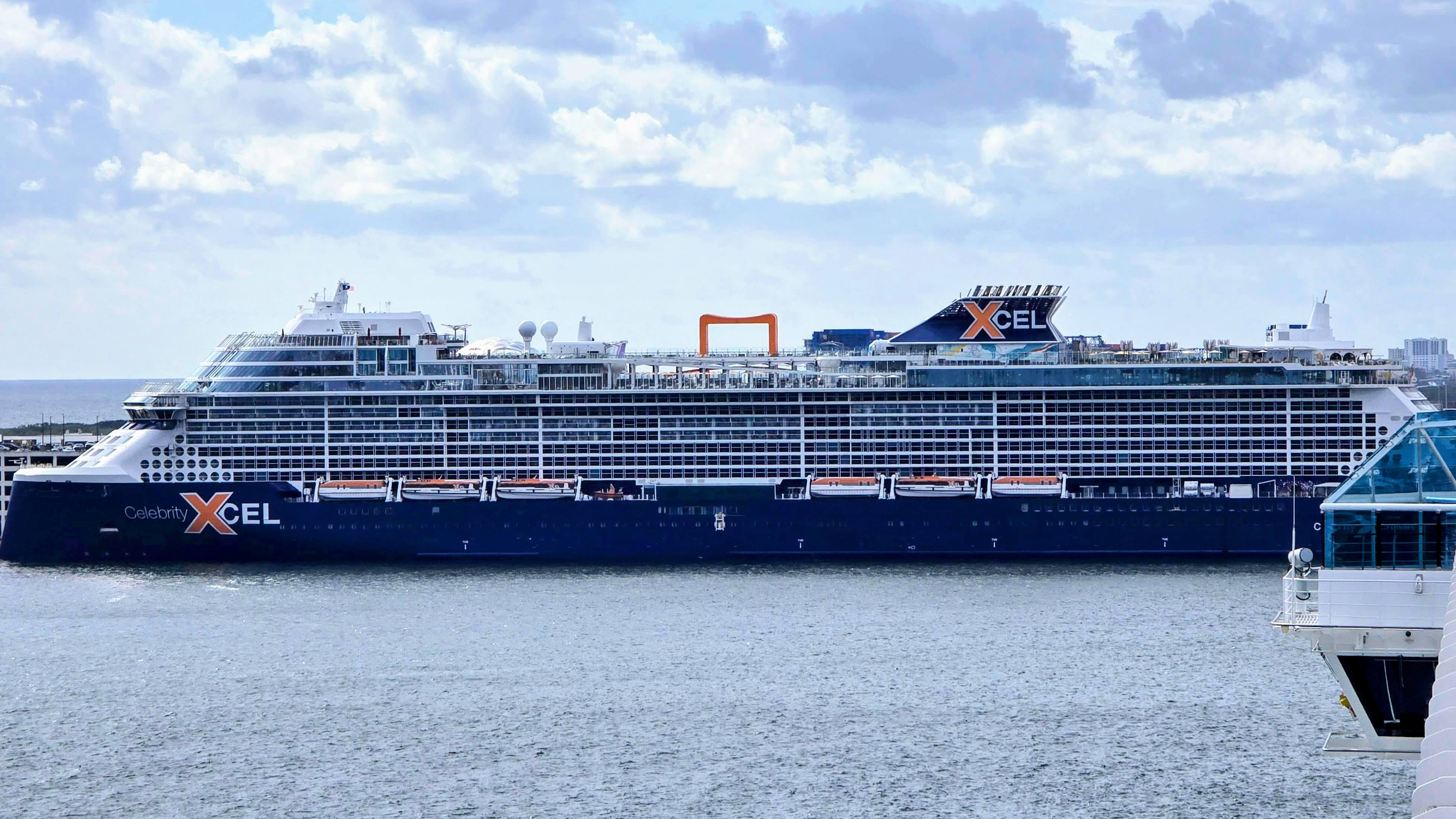
- Celebrity Xcel at Fort Lauderdale, 2025

History
- Name: Celebrity Xcel
- Operator: Celebrity Cruises
- Port of registry: Valletta, (Malta)
- Builder: Chantiers de l'Atlantique
- Yard number: N34
- Laid down: 13 June 2024
- Launched: 18 January 2025
- Sponsored by: Janaína Torres (Chef)
- Christened: 16 November 2025
- Completed: 23 October 2025
- In service: 9 November 2025
- Identification: IMO number: 9884136; MMSI number: 249457000; Callsign: 9HA6265
- Status: In active service

General characteristics
- Class & type: Edge-class cruise ship
- Tonnage: 141,420 GT
- Length: 326.5 m (1,071 ft 2 in)
- Beam: 39.5 m (129 ft 7 in)
- Height: 57.9 m (190 ft 0 in) (New Panamax)
- Draught: 8.5 m (27 ft 11 in)
- Decks: 21
- Installed power: 2 × Wärtsilä W12V46F; 2 × Wärtsilä W8L46F; 1 × Wärtsilä W12V32
- Propulsion: 2 × ABB azipod 4 x tunnel thruster
- Speed: 22.6 knots (41.9 km/h; 26.0 mph)
- Capacity: 3,260 passengers (double occupancy); 3,937 passengers (maximum)
- Crew: 1,416

Celebrity Xcel is the fifth Edge-class cruise ship built by Celebrity Cruises. She is sister ship of Celebrity Edge, Celebrity Apex, Celebrity Beyond, and Celebrity Ascent. The ship was constructed at the Chantiers de l'Atlantique shipyard and delivered in October 2025.

== Design and construction ==
The ship was ordered in April 2019, and was originally intended to be the fifth and final Edge-class ship. On 7 November 2023, construction began with the first steel cut at Chantiers de l'Atlantique shipyard. At the steel cutting ceremony the name of the ship was announced as Celebrity Xcel.

On 13 June 2024 the keel was laid, with the first 739-ton steel block for the new ship was lowered into the dry dock. This event was attended by Royal Caribbean Group CEO Jason Liberty, Celebrity Cruises President Laura Hodges Bethge and Laurent Castaing, GM of Chantiers de l'Atlantique. As per maritime tradition, newly minted coins were welded to the first piece of steel for good luck, with the coin design featuring NASA's Saturn V rocket.

On 18 January 2025, the ship was floated out from the dry dock, with sea trials completed on 15 September 2025. On 23 October 2025 Celebrity took delivery of the ship from Chantiers de l'Atlantique.

=== Tri-fuel-capable engine ===
Celebrity Xcel is the first in the Celebrity fleet to have a tri-fuel-capable engine. Wärtsilä provided two converted 8-cylinder Wärtsilä 46F engines to allow the ship to utilize three fuel sources, including methanol. Utilizing methanol as a fuel option, local emission like sulphur oxides (SOx), nitrogen oxides (NOx), and particulate matter are significantly reduced from the ship's exhaust. To accommodate this future fuel option a new exhaust funnel was added between the "X" main funnel.

=== New design features ===
The cruise ship reintroduced the "X" logo to the side of the funnel in a new orange color scheme and incorporating the ship's name, along with an enlarged hull name similar convention to ships in the Royal Caribbean fleet. On board the ship many venues have been evolved from the previous Edge-class ship:

- The Bazaar: replaced Eden, changing destination focus venue
- Bazaar Market: retail space, selling destination focused items
- Bora: rebranded Rooftop Garden restaurant
- Attic at The club: Games venue
- Celebrity Flagship: Museum and Retail space
- Hydra Room: Spa dyra pool
- IYKYK: Speakeasy bar

== Service history ==
The Celebrity Xcel arrived at Fort Lauderdale in November 2025, with preview sailings beginning on 9 November 2025. A naming ceremony was held on 16 November 2025, at Port Everglades with Brazilian chef Janaína Torres acting as godmother.
