= List of ship launches in 2023 =

This is a chronological list of some ships launched in 2023 worldwide.

Date	Ship	Class / type	Builder	Location	Country	Notes
4 January	HTMS Chang	Type 071E LSD	Hudong-Zhonghua Shipbuilding	Shanghai	China	For Royal Thai Navy
21 January	Celebrity Ascent	Edge-class cruise ship	Chantiers de l’Atlantique	Saint-Nazaire	France	For Celebrity Cruises
23 January	SH Diana	Vega-class cruise ship	Helsinki Shipyard	Helsinki	Finland	For Swan Hellenic
24 January	QENS Al Fulk	San Giorgio-class LPD	Fincantieri	Palermo	Italy	For Qatari Emiri Navy
25 January	HMS Tachai	Tugboat	Asian Marine Engineering	Samut Prakan	Thailand	For Royal Thai Navy
26 January	Seven Seas Grandeur	Cruise ship	Fincantieri	Ancona	Italy	For Regent Seven Seas Cruises
28 January	Ubuntu Empathy	Bulk carrier	Shanghai Waigaoqiao Shipbuilding	Shanghai	China	For Anglo American
28 January	Ubuntu Humanity	Bulk carrier	Shanghai Waigaoqiao Shipbuilding	Shanghai	China	For Anglo American
2 February	Haugesund Knutsen	LNG bunker	Astilleros Armon Gijon	Barcelona	Spain	For Knutsen
7 February	ADV Cape Woolamai	Cape-class patrol boat	Austal Australia	Henderson	Australia	For Royal Australian Navy
12 February	Mwanza Hapa Kazi Tu	Passenger/cargo ship	GAS Entec, KangNam Corporation	Mwanza	Tanzania	For Marine Services Company
15 February	Mulan Spirit	LNG Carrier	Chinese Shipbuilding Cooperation	Shanghai	China	For Jovo
15 February	Gas Jupiter	Gas carrier	Chinese Shipbuilding Cooperation	Shanghai	China	For Tianjin Southwest Maritime
24 February	Hagland Progress	Bulk carrier	Royal Bodewes		Netherlands	For Hagland Shipping
1 March	Mount Blanc	Bulk carrier	New Times Shipbuilding		China	For Himalaya Shipping
7 March	Baltic Narval	Product tanker	Wuhu Shipbuilding	Wuhu	China	For Continental Bitumen
8 March	Sun Princess	Sphere-class cruise ship	Fincantieri	Monfalcone	Italy	For Princes Cruises
17 March	Three Gorges Hydrogen Boat No. 1	Passenger catamaran	Jianglong Shipbuilding	Guangdong	China	For Yangtze Power Company
20 March	USNS Cody	Spearhead-class EPF	Austal USA	Mobile	United States	For US Navy
20 March	USS Kingsville	Independence-class LCS	Austal USA	Mobile	United States	For US Navy
21 March	INS Androth	Corvette	Garden Reach Shipbuilders and Engineers	Kolkata	India	For Indian Navy
24 March	Alice Cosulich	LNG tanker	Sinopacific Offshore & Engineering		China	For Fratelli Cosulich
29 March	Oostende (M940)	City-class minehunter	Naval Group	Concarneau	France	For Belgian Navy
April	Viking Aton	River Cruise Ship				For Viking River Cruises
6 April	Liselotte Essberger	Chemical tanker	China Merchants	Nanjing	China	For John T. Essberger Group
10 April	ROKS Chungnam	Chungnam-class frigate	Hyundai Heavy Industries	Ulsan	South Korea	For South Korean Navy
4 April	TBA	Container ship	Hyundai Heavy Industries	Ulsan	South Korea	For Maersk Line
6 April	Arklow Rally	Cargo ship	Royal Bodewes	Martenshoek	Netherlands	For Arklow Shipping
15 April	USS Cleveland	Freedom-class LCS	Fincantieri Marinette Marine	Marinette	United States	For US Navy
19 April	KRI Bung Karno	Corvette/presidential yacht	PT Karimun Anugrah Sejati	Batam	Indonesia	For Indonesian Navy
24 April	Great Lagos	Ro-Ro	Hyundai Heavy Industries	Ulsan	South Korea	For Grimaldi Group
25 April	Emerald Sakara		Halong Shipbuilding Company		Vietnam	For Emerald Cruises
27 April	Mount Matterhorn	Bulk carrier	New Times Shipbuilding		China	For Himalaya Shipping
27 April	Mozhaisk	Kilo-II-class submarine	United Shipbuilding Corporation		Russia	For Russian Navy
28 April	Silver Nova	Cruise ship	Meyer Werft	Papenburg	Germany	For Silversea Cruises
2 May	Cayor	OPV 58 S Patrol boat	Piriou	Concarneau	France	For Senegalese Navy
4 May	TBA	Changxing series LNG carrier	Hudong-Zhonghua Shipbuilding		China	For CSSC Shipping
8 May	Lovisa	Cargo ship	Wuhu Shipbuilding	Wuhu	China	For Langh Ship
May	USNS Navajo	Navajo-class rescue and salvage ship	Bollinger Shipyard	Houma, Louisiana	United States	For the Military Sealift Command
16 May	MA CGM Bahia	Cargo ship	Hudong-Zhonghua Shipbuilding		China	For CMA CGM
22 May	Axios II	LNG tanker	Hyundai Heavy Industries	Ulsan	South Korea	For Capital Gas
23 May	Hafnia Larvik.	Oil tanker	Guangzhou Shipyard International	Guangzhou	China	For Vista Shipping
24 May	Zim Amber	Container ship	Yangzijiang Shipbuilding	Jiangsu	China	For Zim Shipping
30 May	TBA	LNG tanker	Hudong-Zhonghua Shipbuilding	Shanghai	China	For Cosco Shipping and PetroChina
9 June	Mount Cook	LNG bulk carrier	New Times Shipbuilding		China	For Eastern Pacific Shipping
9 June	Mount Neblina	LNG bulk carrier	New Times Shipbuilding		China	For Himalaya Shipping
26 June	Paolina Cosulich	LNG bunker	CIMC Sinopacific Offshore & Engineering	Nantong	China	For Fratelli Cosulich
4 July	Energy Endurance	LNG tanker	Hyundai Samho Heavy Industries	Samho-eup, Yeongam	South Korea	For Alpha Gas
21 July	Carnival Jubilee	XL-class cruise ship	Meyer Werft	Papenburg	Germany	For Carnival Cruise Line
August		Car carrier	CSSC Jiangnan Shipbuilding		China	For SAIC Anji Logistics
17 August	ECO Maestro	Container ship	Dayang Shipbuilding Company		China	
28 September		FDI-frigate	Naval Group	Lorient	France	For Greek Navy
September	Utopia of the Seas	Oasis-class cruise ship		Saint-Nazaire	France	For Royal Caribbean International
September	Zhi Cheng & Zhi Zhen					
September	Ilma	Yacht		Saint-Nazaire	France	For The Ritz-Carlton Yacht Collection
6 October	Arklow Ranger		Royal Bodewes	Martenshoek	Netherlands	For Arklow Shipping
7 Oktober	Saint-Malo	E-Flexer-class ferry	Jinling shipyard	Weihai	China	For Stena RoRo
October	Ruggiero di Lauria	Multipurpose Offshore Patrol ship (PPA)	Fincantieri	Muggiano	Italy	For the Italian Navy
27 October	Spirit of Tasmania IV	ferry	Rauma Marine Constructions	Rauma	Finland	
14 November	Yubetsu	Mogami-class frigate	Tamano Works, Mitsubishi Heavy Industries		Japan	For Japanese Navy
30 November	Viking Vela	Venice-class cruise ship	Fincantieri	Ancona	Italy	For Viking Ocean Cruises
November	Mein Schiff Relax	inTUItion-class cruise ship	Fincantieri	Monfalcone	Italy	For TUI Cruises
1 December	Mein Schiff 7		Meyer Turku	Turku	Finland	For TUI Cruises
