= Kate McCue =

American cruise ship captain (born 1978)

- Born: 6 January 1978 (age 48); San Francisco, California, U.S.
- Education: California State University Maritime Academy
- Occupation: Cruise ship captain
- Years active: 1999–Present
- Employer: Four Seasons Yachts
- Spouse: Nikola Petrovic

Kate McCue (born January 6, 1978) is an American cruise ship captain. She is currently employed with Four Seasons Yachts and is the inaugural Captain of Four Seasons l, which entered service on March 20, 2026. When she became the commanding officer of Celebrity Summit in 2015, it was the first time that an American woman had been named captain of a "Mega" cruise ship. Prior to her time at Celebrity, she had worked as an officer for both Disney Cruise Line and Royal Caribbean.

== Early life ==
McCue moved around with her family during her childhood due to her father's employment as an engineer. Originally from San Francisco, she spent time in Evans, Georgia, where she attended Lakeside High School, and was resident for a period in Michigan. After travelling with her family on a cruise ship to the Bahamas when she was 12, she sought to become a cruise director. Her family then moved back to San Francisco.

== Maritime career ==
McCue began attending the California State University Maritime Academy, then California Maritime Academy, in 1996. Graduating with a Bachelor's degree in business administration in 1999, she also studied celestial navigation during sailing trips in the summer breaks. While undertaking her degree, she held an internship for Chiquita Brands International working on one of their cargo ships, transporting bananas from Ecuador to Long Beach, California. After graduation, McCue moved to Maui in the Hawaiian Islands where she stayed with her cousins for six months, working as a general deck hand on a catamaran performing tourist cruises to the Molokini crater. She then became a logistics manager to Maersk Sealand in Los Angeles, but ultimately wanted to return to sea.

After applying to cruise lines for nine months, McCue became a third mate with Disney Cruise Line, which is considered an entry-level position. In 2003, she became a second officer for Royal Caribbean, being promoted to first officer after a year of service. McCue attended the Maritime Institute of Technology and Graduate Studies (MITAGS) in Baltimore in 2009 where she earned her Chief Mate and Master's License, enabling her to take command of a vessel. Upon returning to Royal Caribbean McCue was promoted first to chief officer—the senior first officer—and then to second in command as staff captain in 2011.

The president of Celebrity Cruises, Lisa Lutoff-Perlo, contacted McCue in 2015 and asked her to apply for a role of captain. Celebrity Cruises is owned by Royal Caribbean Cruises LTD. McCue was appointed as the commanding officer of Celebrity Summit on September 13, 2015, making her the first American woman to command a modern "mega ship". Lutoff-Perlo later said, "Kate was the first opportunity to make significant change at Celebrity related to gender equality." In 2018, McCue left the Summit to become commanding officer on Celebrity Equinox and subsequently moved to the Celebrity Edge in 2019. On October 14, 2021, Celebrity Cruises announced that McCue would take the helm of Celebrity Beyond, their newest ship at the time of its debut in spring 2022.

McCue's sphynx cat, Bug Naked, sailed with her aboard and attracted media attention. Bug Naked passed away on December 26, 2024.

On February 24, 2025, McCue announced via Instagram that she was leaving Celebrity Cruises.

On March 18, 2025, Four Seasons Yachts announced McCue's appointment as the inaugural Captain of Four Seasons l, which entered service in January 2026.

On August 5, 2026, McCue announced via Instagram, her resignation from Four Seasons to focus on family, though clarifying that she was retaining her captain's license.
