= Lisa Lutoff-Perlo =

CEO of Celebrity Cruises

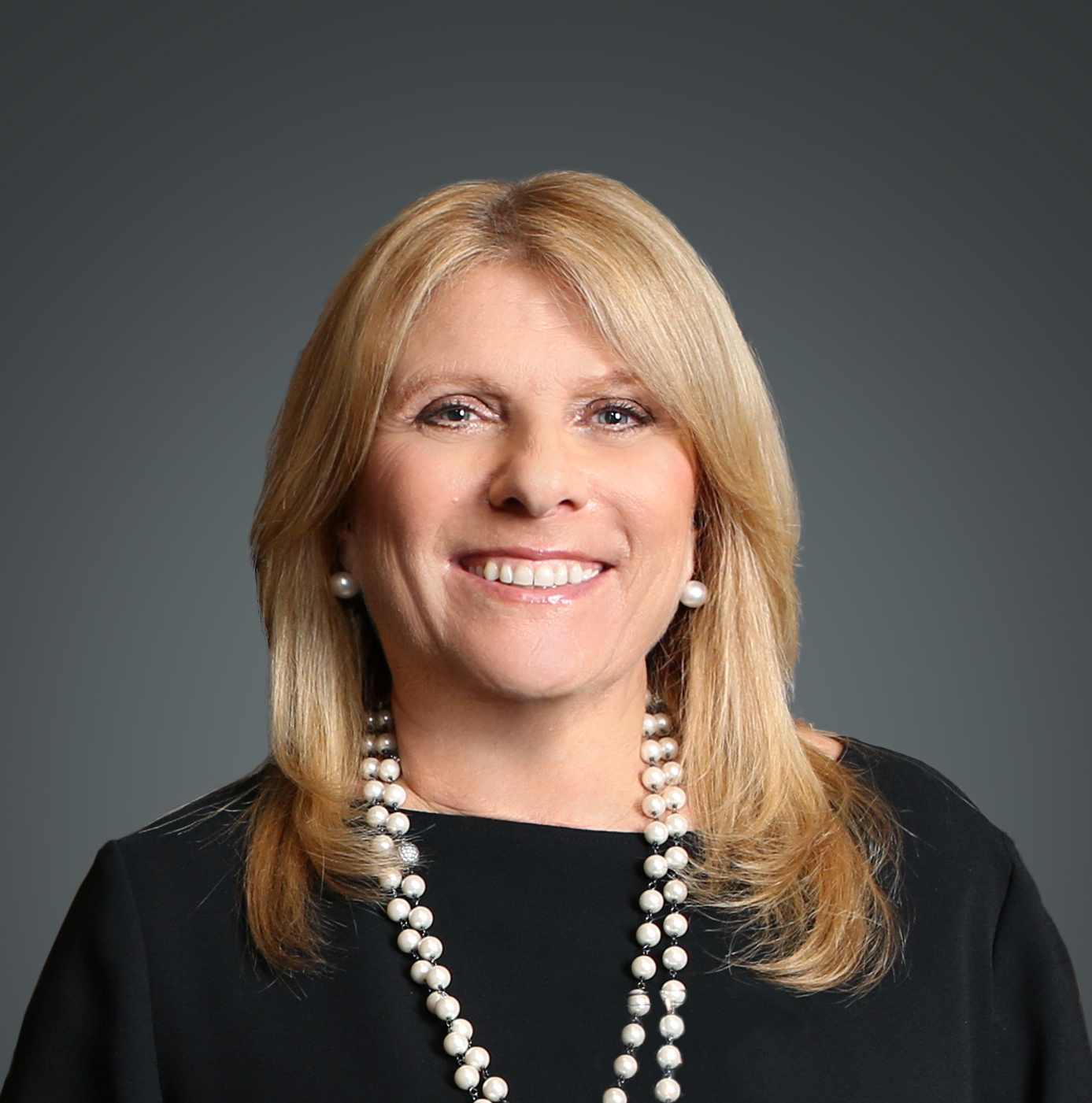
- Born: April 19, 1957 (age 69); Gloucester, Massachusetts
- Education: Bentley University
- Occupations: Vice Chair, External Affairs Royal Caribbean Group
- Years active: 2005–present
- Known for: President and CEO of Celebrity Cruises
- Spouse: Andre Perlo

Lisa Lutoff-Perlo is an American businesswoman. She was the president and CEO of Celebrity Cruises, making her the first woman to lead one of the Royal Caribbean Group's cruise line brands.

== Early life ==
Lutoff-Perlo was born and raised in Gloucester and graduated from Gloucester High School in 1975. After high school, she attended Bentley University.

== Career ==
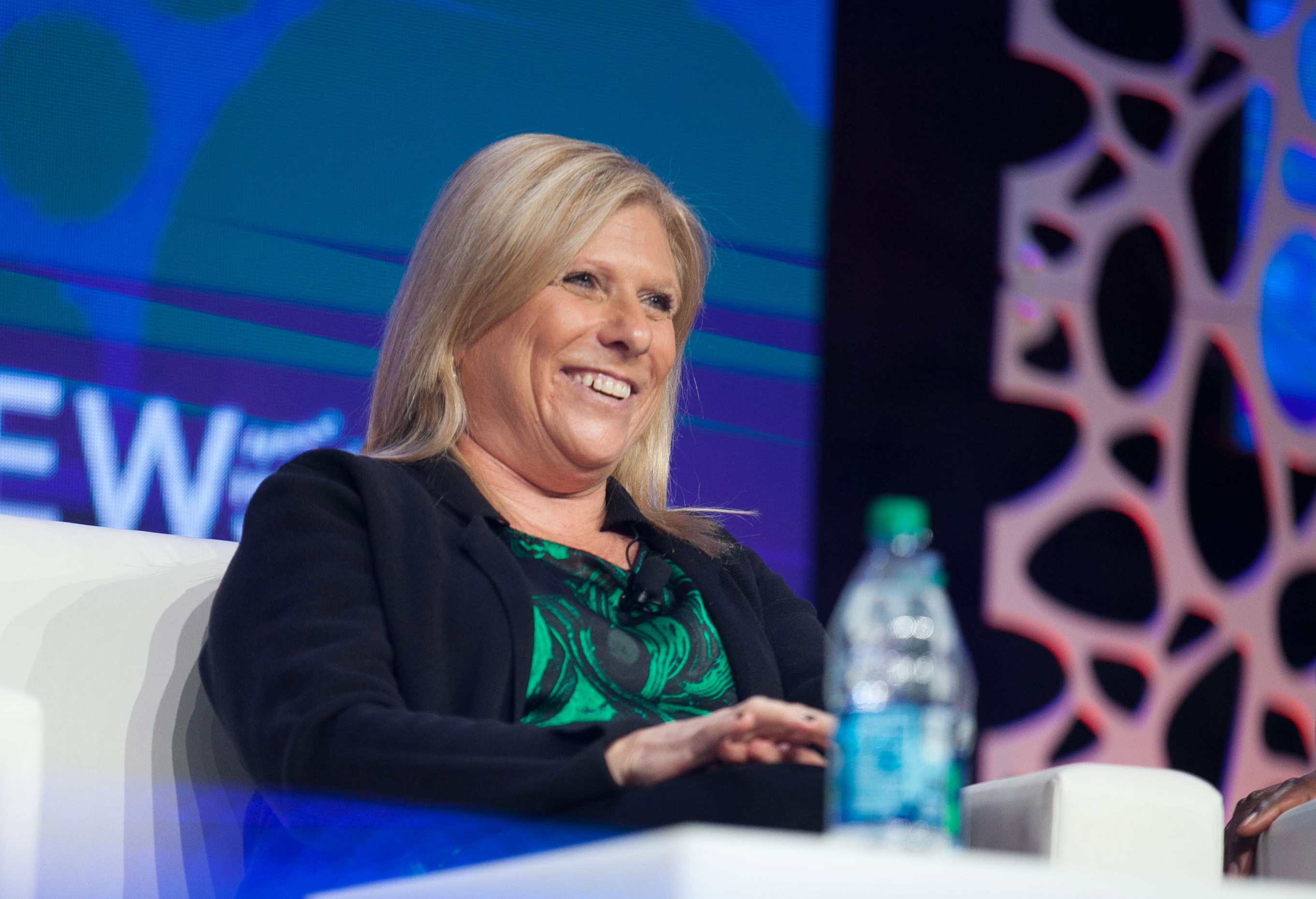
Lutoff-Perlo at CruiseWorld in 2015

Lutoff-Perlo began her career in the travel industry after seeing a help wanted ad for a travel advisor at Crimson Travel. While with Crimson Travel, she was in constant communication with Royal Caribbean International and learned that there was an open position as a Miami sales manager. In 1985, she was hired as a district sales manager for Royal Caribbean and moved to Miami.

Lutoff-Perlo worked her way up the corporate ladder until she became associate vice president of national and corporate sales for both Celebrity Cruises and Royal Caribbean International. In 2005, she was named vice president of onboard revenue for Celebrity Cruises.

In 2012, Lutoff-Perlo was appointed senior vice president of operations for Royal Caribbean International. She stayed in this position for four years before being promoted to president and CEO of Celebrity Cruises. She became the first woman to lead one of the Royal Caribbean Group's cruise line brands. In her first year as president and CEO, Lutoff-Perlo hired Captain Kate McCue, the first American woman to captain a cruise ship.

In 2017, she was honored as a South Florida “Women of Excellence” by the Cleveland Clinic Florida. The next year, she announced that Celebrity Cruises would become the first cruise line to conduct legal same-sex marriages at sea. This was also the year that Celebrity Edge began operation, a new Celebrity Cruises ship that began a new line of a fleet of ships. In 2019, she was the recipient of the Cruise Lines International Association Lifetime Achievement award.
