= Celebrity Ascent =

Passenger cruise ship launched in 2023

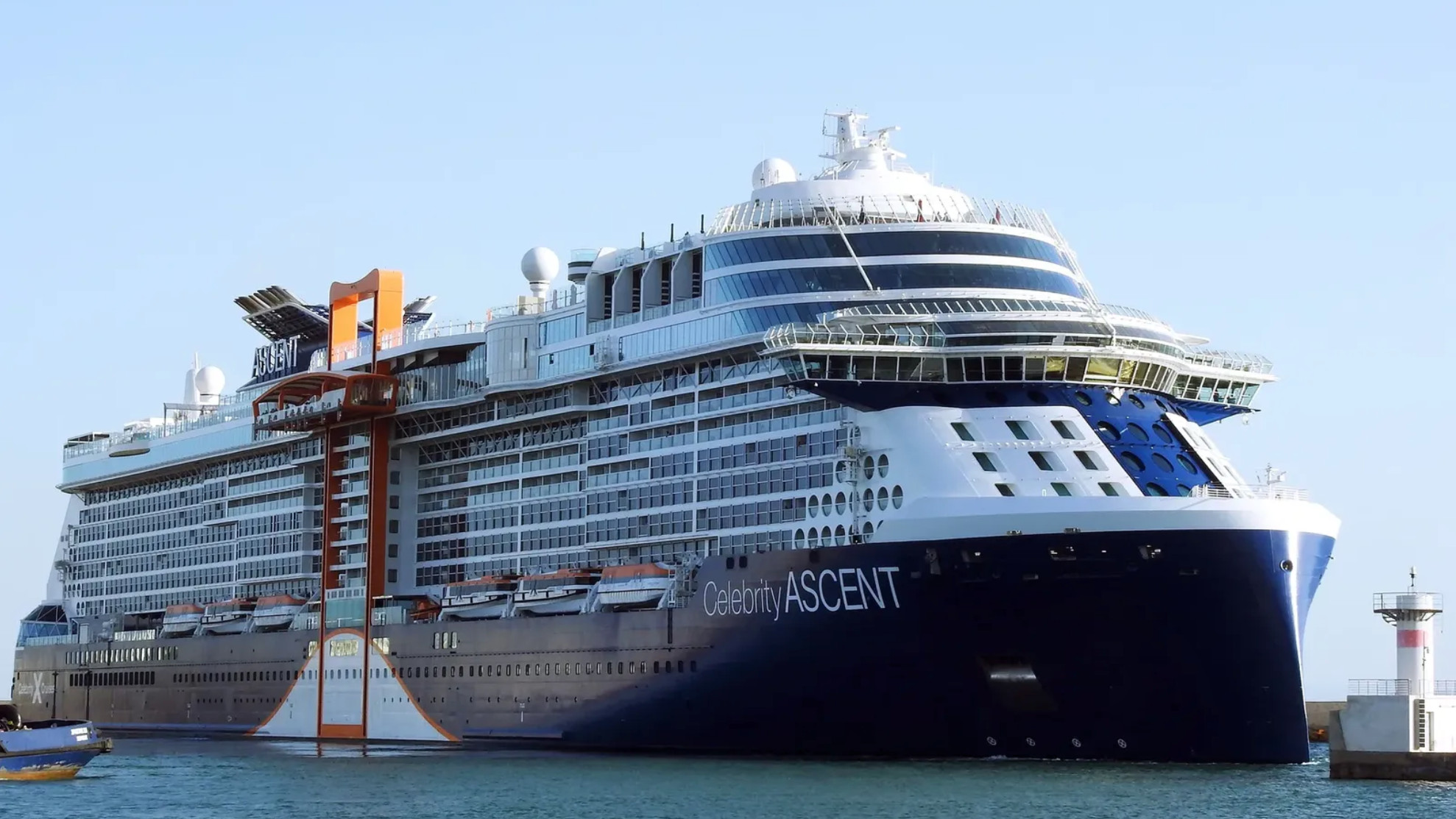
- Celebrity Ascent in 2024

History
- Name: Celebrity Ascent
- Owner: Celebrity Ascent LLC. (Royal Caribbean Group)
- Operator: Celebrity Cruises
- Port of registry: Valletta, (Malta)
- Builder: Chantiers de l'Atlantique
- Yard number: M34
- Laid down: 17 November 2021
- Launched: 2023
- Sponsored by: Captain Sandy Yawn and Michelle Dunham
- Christened: 1 December 2023
- Completed: 24 January 2023
- Maiden voyage: 3 December 2023
- In service: 22 November 2023
- Identification: IMO number: 9838400; MMSI number: 256191000; Callsign: 9HA5731
- Status: In active service

General characteristics
- Class & type: Edge-class cruise ship
- Tonnage: 141,420 GT
- Length: 326.5 m (1,071 ft 2 in)
- Beam: 39.5 m (129 ft 7 in)
- Height: 57.9 m (190 ft 0 in) (New Panamax)
- Draught: 8.5 m (27 ft 11 in)
- Decks: 21
- Installed power: 2 × Wärtsilä W12V46F; 2 × Wärtsilä W8L46F; 1 × Wärtsilä W12V32
- Propulsion: 2 × ABB azipod 4 x tunnel thruster
- Speed: 22.6 knots (41.9 km/h; 26.0 mph)
- Capacity: 3,260 passengers (double occupancy); 3,937 passengers (maximum)
- Crew: 1,416

Celebrity Ascent is an Edge-class cruise ship owned by Celebrity Cruises. She is the sister ship of Celebrity Edge, Celebrity Apex, and Celebrity Beyond. The vessel's name derives from the company's slogan. The ship was constructed at the Chantiers de l'Atlantique shipyard, and entered service on 22 November 2023.
