= Edge-class cruise ship =

Class of cruise ship

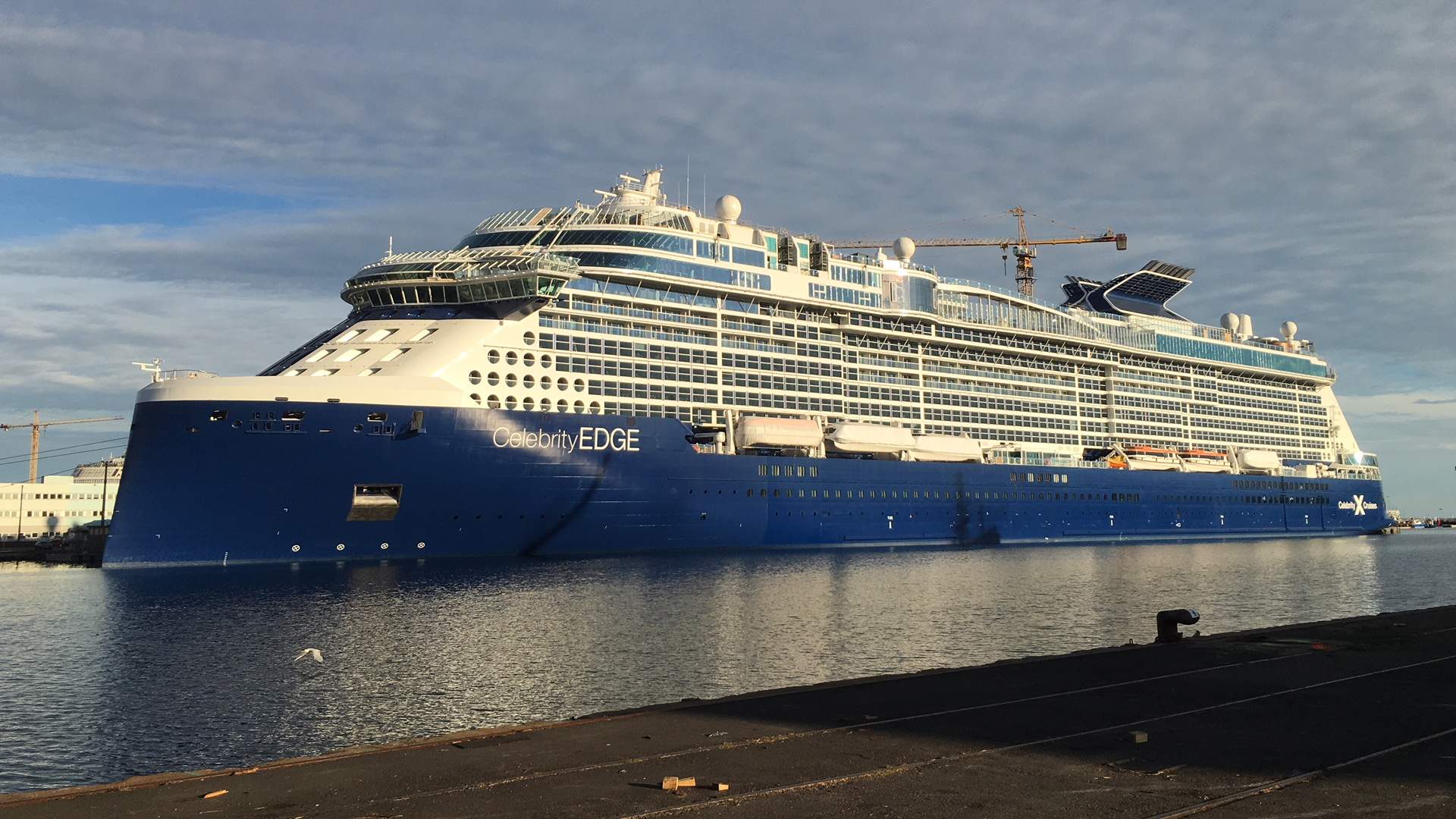
- The lead ship, Celebrity Edge, at Saint Nazaire, France

Class overview
- Builders: Chantiers de l'Atlantique (France)
- Operators: Celebrity Cruises
- Preceded by: Solstice class
- Planned: 6
- Building: 1
- Completed: 5
- Active: 5

General characteristics
- Type: Cruise ship
- Tonnage: 130,818 GT; 140,600 GT
- Length: 306 m (1,003 ft 11 in); 327 m (1,073 ft)
- Beam: 39 m (127 ft 11 in)
- Draught: 8.4 m (27 ft 7 in)
- Installed power: 2 × Wärtsilä 8L46F (6 × 9.6MW); 2 × Wärtsilä 12V46F (4 × 14.4MW); 1 × Wärtsilä 12V32E (5 × 6.96MW)
- Propulsion: 2 × ABB Azipod; 4 × Brunvoll FU115 tunnel thruster
- Capacity: 2,918 in 1,467 staterooms; 1,650 staterooms

The Edge class is a class of cruise ships operated by Celebrity Cruises, a subsidiary of Royal Caribbean Cruises Ltd. The class is constructed by Chantiers de l'Atlantique of France. At present, there are five active Edge-class ships: the lead vessel of the class Celebrity Edge, Celebrity Apex, Celebrity Beyond, Celebrity Ascent, and Celebrity Xcel. Celebrity Apex was scheduled to begin operations in April 2020, but entry into service was delayed until June 2021 due to the COVID-19 pandemic. Celebrity Ascent welcomed its first guests in November 2023. A fifth ship, Celebrity Xcel debuted in November 2025 and a sixth ship, Celebrity Xcite, will enter service in 2028.

Both Celebrity Edge and Celebrity Apex were built with a gross tonnage (GT) of 130,818. Subsequent new builds have a hull extended by 20 metres (66 ft), bringing the length of the ship to 327 metres (1,072 ft 10 in), and an increased gross tonnage to 140,600 GT. Ships in this class are reported to cost US$1 billion each.

== History ==
=== Orders ===
On 4 December 2014, Royal Caribbean Cruises Ltd. announced that it had signed a letter of intent with STX France for two new ships that would compose a new class of vessels for the Celebrity Cruises fleet. In June 2015, the letter was converted into a formal order for the first two ships.

On 25 May 2016, Royal Caribbean Cruises Ltd. announced that it had signed a memorandum of understanding with STX France for two additional ships for the Edge class. These two vessels comprise the third and fourth in the class, originally scheduled for delivery in fall 2021 and 2022, respectively.

On 11 April 2019, Royal Caribbean Cruises Ltd. ordered a fifth Edge-class ship with Chantiers de l'Atlantique, with delivery scheduled for fall 2024, since revised to 2025.

On 21 January 2025, Royal Caribbean Cruises Ltd. added a sixth Edge-class ship order, having previously announced that the fifth would be the last. This additional ship is due for delivery in 2028.

=== Construction ===
Celebrity Cruises marked the beginning of construction for the first Edge-class vessel with the steel-cutting ceremony on 21 November 2016 at the STX France shipyard. On the same day, the lead vessel's name was announced as Celebrity Edge. She was delivered on 31 October 2018.

Celebrity initially named the second vessel of the Edge class as Celebrity Beyond, but she was renamed Celebrity Apex on the day of her steel-cutting on 23 July 2018. She was delivered on 27 March 2020.

Celebrity celebrated the steel-cutting of the third ship, named Celebrity Beyond, on 28 January 2020. She is the first of three vessels in the class to evolve in design and expand in gross tonnage. She entered into service on 27 April 2022 with a sailing from Southampton, United Kingdom. Celebrity Beyond has been under the command of Captain Kate McCue, the first American Female to take command of a vessel, since her construction.

The steel cutting for Celebrity's fourth Edge-class vessel, Celebrity Ascent, occurred on 17 November 2021. The ship entered service with Celebrity on 22 November 2023 on a "preview" sailing out of Port Everglades, Florida.

The steel cutting for Celebrity's sixth Edge-class vessel, Celebrity Xcite, occurred on 23 October 2025 coinciding with the official acceptance date of the 5th ship in the series, Celebrity Xcel.

== Ships ==
Name building number	Status	Entered service for Celebrity	Gross tonnage	Flag	Notes	Image
Celebrity Edge; J34	In service	25 November 2018	130,818	Malta		
Celebrity Apex; K34	In service	19 June 2021	130,818	Malta		
Celebrity Beyond; L34	In service	27 April 2022	141,420	Malta	Steel cut on 28 January 2020 and hull lengthened to 327 m (1,073 ft)	
Celebrity Ascent; M34	In service	22 November 2023	141,420	Malta	Construction started on 17 November 2021 Float out completed 24 January 2023; Planned maiden voyage 3 December 2023; Floating engine room unit built at CRIST, Gdynia	
Celebrity Xcel; N34	In service	18 November 2025	141,262	Malta	Construction started 7 November 2023.	
Celebrity Xcite	Under Construction	TBA 2028	141,262 (planned)		First Steel Cut 23 October 2025	
