= Celebrity Apex =

Cruise ship operated by Celebrity Cruises

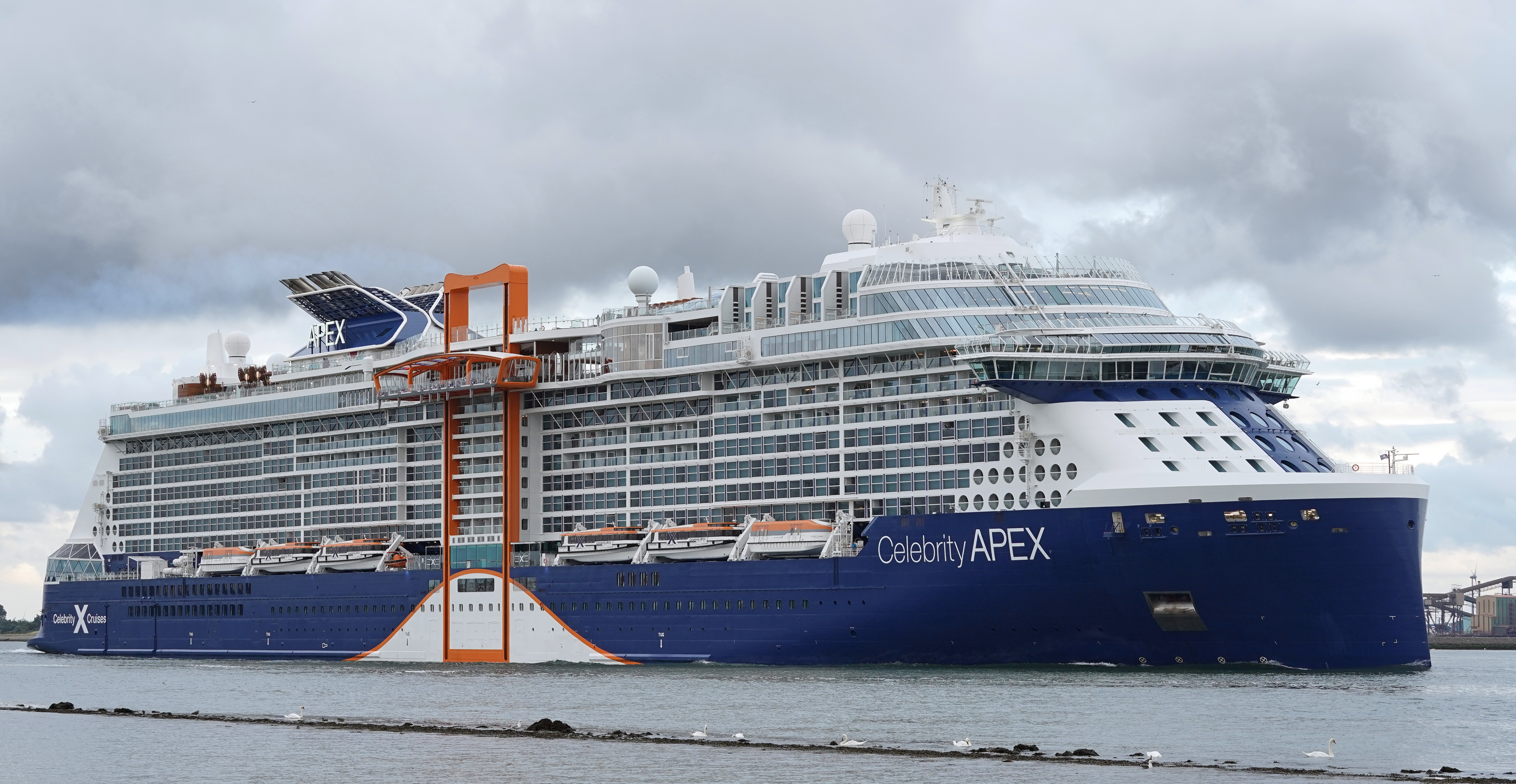
- Celebrity Apex near Hook of Holland, 2023

History

Malta
- Name: Celebrity Apex
- Owner: Celebrity Apex Inc. (Royal Caribbean Group)
- Operator: Celebrity Cruises
- Port of registry: Valletta, Malta
- Ordered: 1 February 2015
- Builder: Chantiers de l'Atlantique (Saint-Nazaire, France)
- Yard number: K34
- Laid down: 6 July 2018
- Launched: 17 May 2019
- Christened: late 2020; by Reshma Saujani
- Completed: March 2020
- Acquired: 27 March 2020
- Identification: Callsign: 9HA4960; IMO number: 9838383; MMSI number: 215105000; DNV ID: 35379

General characteristics
- Class & type: Edge-class cruise ship
- Tonnage: 130,818 GT
- Length: 306 m (1,003 ft 11 in)
- Beam: 39 m (127 ft 11 in)
- Draught: 8.4 m (27 ft 7 in)
- Decks: 14 passenger decks
- Installed power: 2 × Wärtsilä 8L46F (2 × 9.6 MW); 2 × Wärtsilä 12V46F (2 × 14.4 MW); 1 × Wärtsilä 12V32E (1 × 6.96 MW)
- Propulsion: 2 × ABB Azipod; 4 × Brunvoll FU115 tunnel thruster
- Speed: Maximum speed: 22.7 knots (42.0 km/h; 26.1 mph)
- Capacity: 2,910
- Crew: 1,320

Celebrity Apex is an Edge-class cruise ship operated by Celebrity Cruises, a subsidiary of Royal Caribbean Cruises Ltd. Constructed at Chantiers de l'Atlantique in Saint-Nazaire, France, she is the second vessel in the company's Edge class of ships, following the delivery of her sister ship, Celebrity Edge, in 2018. Due to the COVID-19 pandemic, her debut sailing was from Athens on June 19, 2021, to the Greek Islands.

== Background and design ==
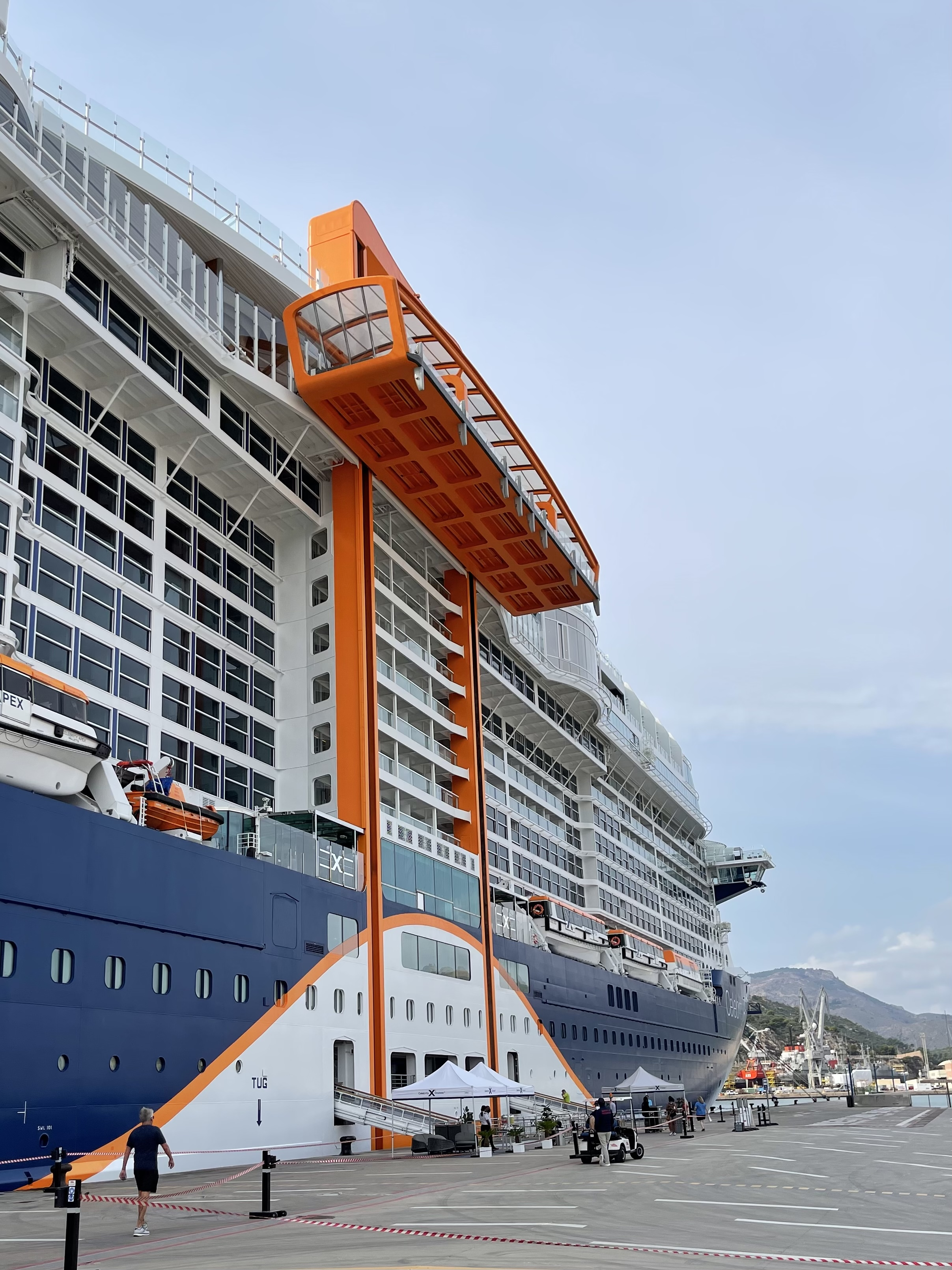
The "Magic Carpet" on the starboard side of Celebrity Apex

On 4 December 2014, Celebrity's parent company, Royal Caribbean Cruises Ltd., announced that they had finalized an order with STX France for two new ships that would compose a new class of vessels for the Celebrity Cruises fleet. The two ships were known under Project EDGE and were planned to be at 117,000 gross tonnage (GT) each, with a guest capacity of 2,900 passengers. Deliveries were originally planned for Fall 2018 and early 2020 for the two vessels, respectively. Each ship was reported to come at a cost of US$1 billion.

Like her sister ship, Celebrity Edge, Celebrity Apex is equipped with the "Magic Carpet," an orange cantilevered platform suspended along the starboard side of the ship that can move vertically between the top and bottom decks. The platform is designed to facilitate more seamless tender service and also create more guest space when at sea. More of Celebrity Edge's features unique to the company fleet carry over to Celebrity Apex, including the "infinite veranda" balcony staterooms that integrate the balcony patios into the cabins' structure, a three-deck aft dining and performance venue called "Eden," and an outdoor garden on the top deck. She is also similarly designed to maximize fuel efficiency with her "parabolic ultrabow", a bow vertically rising towards its decks that provides additional sheathing for the bulbous bow and also houses the propellers to reduce drag.

== History ==
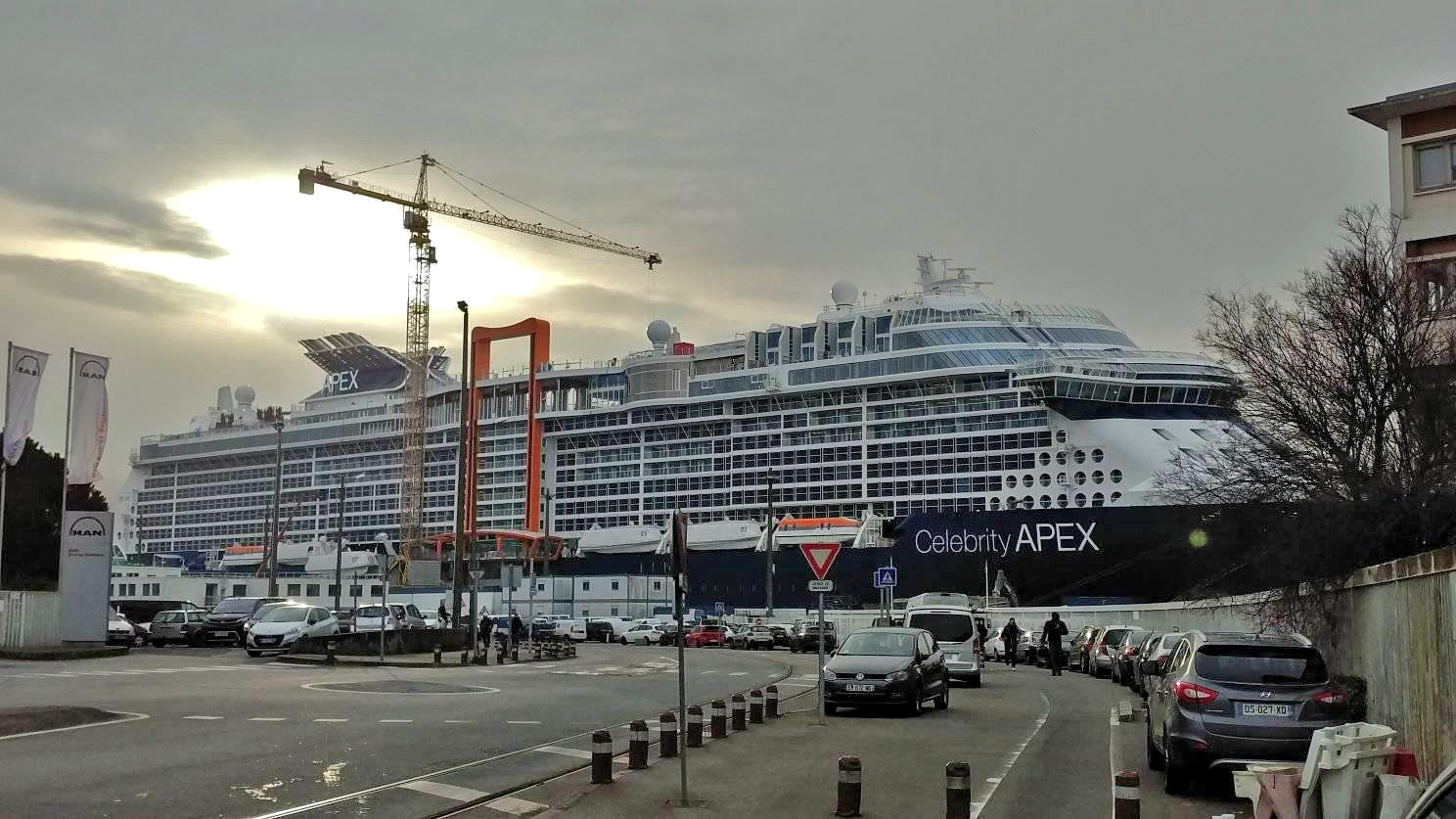
Celebrity Apex in Saint-Nazaire in January 2020

=== Construction and sea trials ===
On 21 November 2016, the day of Celebrity Edge's steel-cutting ceremony, Celebrity also announced the name of the second ship in the Edge class as Celebrity Beyond. On 23 July 2018, Celebrity marked the beginning of construction for the ship with a steel-cutting ceremony at the shipyard and also announced a name change for the second Edge-class ship from Celebrity Beyond to Celebrity Apex. A ceremony marking the laying of the keel was celebrated on 31 October 2018, performed in conjunction with the delivery of Celebrity Edge. She was floated out from the shipyard on 17 May 2019.

The commencement for the ship's sea trials were hampered twice. The first set was initially set for 15 January 2020, but were cancelled due to bad weather. The new date of 17 January 2020 faced a second setback, a tugboat and port sailors' strike. The ship ultimately left for her first set of sea trials in the Bay of Biscay on 4 February 2020 and completed them on 8 February 2020.

Construction on the vessel was completed in early March 2020.

=== Delivery and christening ===
The COVID-19 pandemic impacted the ship's delivery process and christening timeline. In what was believed to be the first virtual delivery of a cruise ship due to the travel restrictions that were in place, Celebrity took virtual delivery of Celebrity Apex on 27 March 2020 via a video conference between officials from Celebrity and Chantiers de l'Atlantique. The ship was initially scheduled to be delivered a week prior, on 20 March, at the shipyard.

On 16 January 2020, Celebrity originally announced that Reshma Saujani, founder and CEO of Girls Who Code, would christen the vessel at the inaugural ceremony in Southampton on 30 March 2020, but it was announced on 5 March 2020 that all naming festivities would be postponed until the ship arrived in Fort Lauderdale, Florida in late 2020.

=== Operational career ===
On 26 March 2020, the Regional Health Agency of the French region Pays de la Loire reported that seven crew members aboard Celebrity Apex had tested positive for SARS-CoV-2. At the time, Celebrity Apex had just been constructed at Chantiers de l'Atlantique and was waiting to be delivered to Celebrity. There were 1407 crew members already on board at the time.

Before the first positive cases were reported, reports showed practices aboard the ship did not reflect the seriousness of the progression of the pandemic at the time. For example, a large party was held on 21 March 2020, even when France had been under a national lockdown beginning on 17 March 2020. However, once the first seven crew members tested positive, the whole crew was placed in isolation and forbidden from leaving the ship.

The next day, on 27 March 2020, 29 people had tested positive for the virus, and one person had been brought to a hospital with breathing issues. By 31 March 2020, 157 people had tested positive and two had been hospitalized; by the next week, on 7 April 2020, 217 people had tested positive, with four hospitalized and two in intensive care; and by the following week, on 15 April 2020, 224 people had tested positive, out of a total of 1444 people tested. (Note: Some sources state that approximately 350 people had tested positive, but they all seem to have based that number on a lawsuit brought against Celebrity Cruises, where the complaint, filed on 14 April 2020, alleged that on 6 April 2020, [a]pproximately three hundred and fifty (350) crewmembers working aboard the Celebrity Apex test[ed] positive for COVID-19. Eight (8) crewmembers who tested positive were admitted to a local French hospital; four (4) such crewmembers who displayed symptoms return[ed] to the ship a few days later, the other four (4) remain[ed] in the French hospital. This estimate of roughly 350 crew members testing positive by 6 April 2020 appears much larger than the 217 positive cases that the Regional Health Agency reportedly reported the following day, so it is assumed to be a very rough estimate.)

Citing Celebrity's mistreatment of the ship's crew during the pandemic, a crew member of Celebrity Apex, who tested positive for the virus on 30 March 2020, filed a class action lawsuit against the cruise line on 14 April 2020 "on behalf of all ... similarly situated crewmembers working aboard [Celebrity Cruises's] vessels". The lawsuit alleged that Celebrity failed to provide proper personal protective equipment (PPE), allowed independent contractors to freely enter and exit the ship, failed to test people boarding the ship for symptoms of coronavirus, failed to enact appropriate lockdown measures, and failed to provide "prompt, proper, and adequate medical care" to its employees, amongst other claims.

The COVID-19 pandemic also impacted the ship's inaugural season. Celebrity Apex was originally scheduled to set sail from Saint-Nazaire towards Southampton on 21 March 2020, following her delivery ceremony. Her pre-inaugural voyage was scheduled for 1 April 2020, a four-night sailing out of Southampton, calling in Bruges and Amsterdam. Her maiden voyage was set for 5 April 2020, traveling along the coasts of Spain and Portugal. She was scheduled to homeport in Southampton through the spring, before re-positioning to the Mediterranean for the summer. Celebrity's suspension of operations due to the pandemic resulted in the postponement of her maiden voyage and the cancellation of all Southampton sailings as well as the second tentative debut date, which had been set for 20 May from Barcelona.

Celebrity Apex was scheduled to re-position to Port Everglades in Fort Lauderdale in fall 2020 to sail week-long, round-trip Eastern and Western Caribbean itineraries.
