= Celebrity Cruises =

Cruise line

- Type: Subsidiary
- Industry: Cruises; Hospitality; Travel; Tourism
- Founded: 1988; 38 years ago in Greece
- Founder: Chandris Group
- Headquarters: 25.7753°N 80.1780°W, Miami, Florida, U.S.
- Area served: Worldwide
- Key people: Laura Hodges Bethge (President)
- Products: Cruises
- Parent: Royal Caribbean Group
- Website: celebritycruises.com

Celebrity Cruises is a cruise line headquartered in Miami and a wholly owned subsidiary of Royal Caribbean Group. Celebrity Cruises was founded in 1988 by the Greece-based Chandris Group, and merged with Royal Caribbean Cruise Line in 1997. The line is currently marketed and positioned as a more premium and upscale cruise line compared to more mainstream lines such as Royal Caribbean International.

== History ==
=== Chandris Group (1988–1997) ===
==== Founding and first ship SS Meridian ====
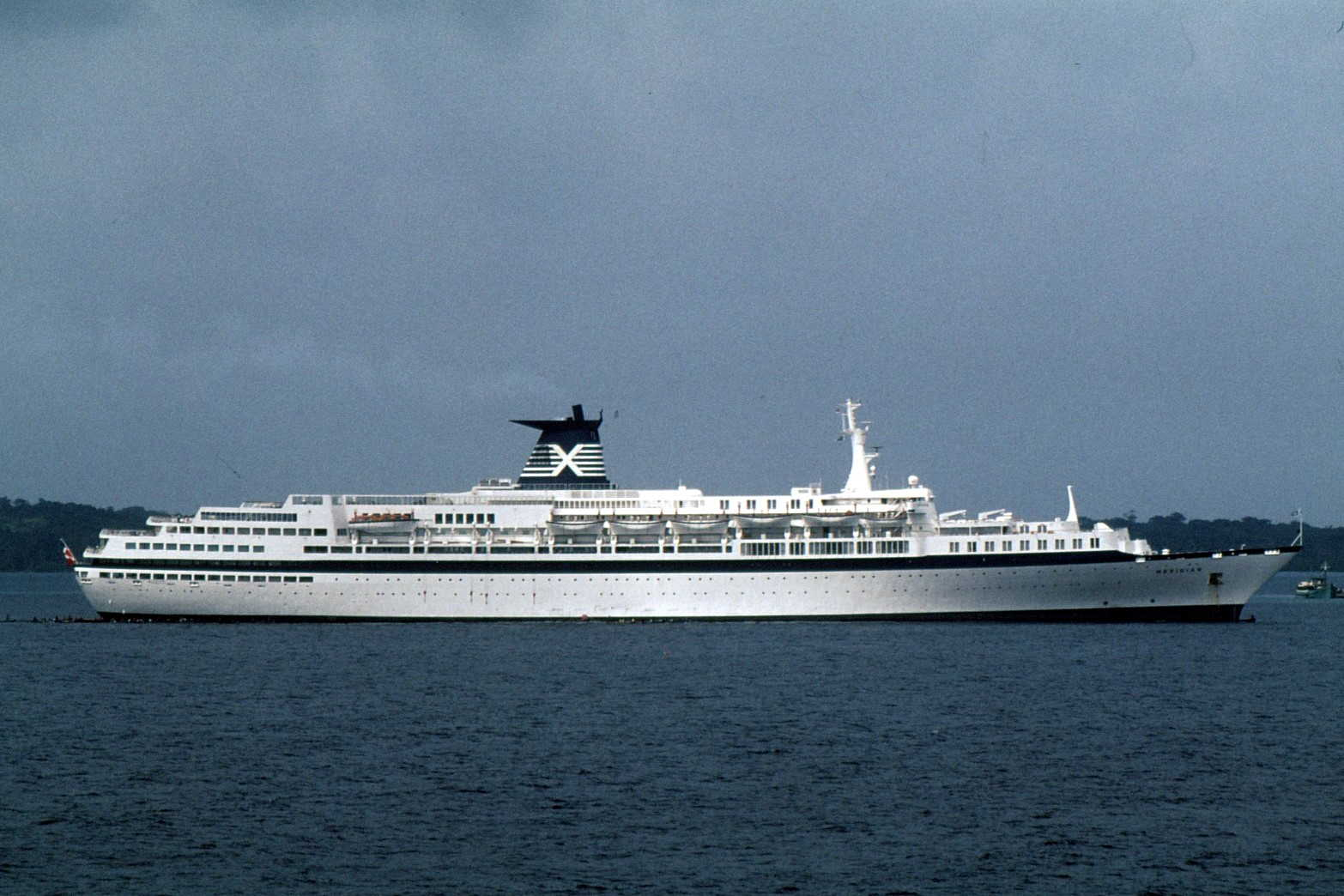
Celebrity Cruises' first ship, SS Meridian

Celebrity Cruises was founded in April 1988 as a subsidiary of Chandris Group, based in Athens, to operate upmarket cruise ships to Bermuda. Chandris had been involved in cruise traffic since the 1960s, and during the late 1980s the company operated in the United States market under the brand name Chandris Cruises. Chandris Fantasy Cruises targeted the lower end of the cruise passenger market, with fleets consisting of second-hand ocean liners.

Celebrity Cruises came into existence in April 1988, when Home Lines, at the time one of the world's leading premium cruise lines, was sold to Holland America Line. Home Lines' ships had held two of the five contracts offered by the Government of Bermuda to cruise lines, giving the ships priority berthing arrangement and unlimited access to sail to the islands in exchange for the ships sailing to Bermuda between April and October each year. Although these contracts were highly valued, Holland America Line withdrew the former Home Lines ships from this service, leaving an opening for two new ships to gain access. Chandris wanted to acquire the contracts, but the Government of Bermuda was only willing to award them to upmarket cruise lines, which Chandris Fantasy Cruises was not.

Chandris created Celebrity Cruises to gain the Bermuda Government contracts and immediately began negotiating with the Bermuda Government in April 1988. As a result of the negotiations, Celebrity Cruises was awarded the contract for two ships for five years beginning in 1990 To fulfill the contract, Chandris Fantasy Cruises' Galileo was rebuilt at Lloyd Werft, Germany in 1989, re-entering service as the SS Meridian for Celebrity Cruises in February 1990.

Celebrity Cruises adopted the Chandris "Χ" (the Greek letter Chi, standing for "Chandris"), which was slightly stylized for their logo. The new line advertised itself as a “Luxury Cruising by Design", with the strategy of offering an upscale product with mass-market pricing. The ships would have refined interiors, destinations and dining, which included a partnership with famed chef Michel Roux, a unique thing for a cruise line at the time. Quoted by then chairman John Chandris, "We will feature comfort and quality, not glitz and glitter."

==== First new-builds: Horizon and Zenith ====
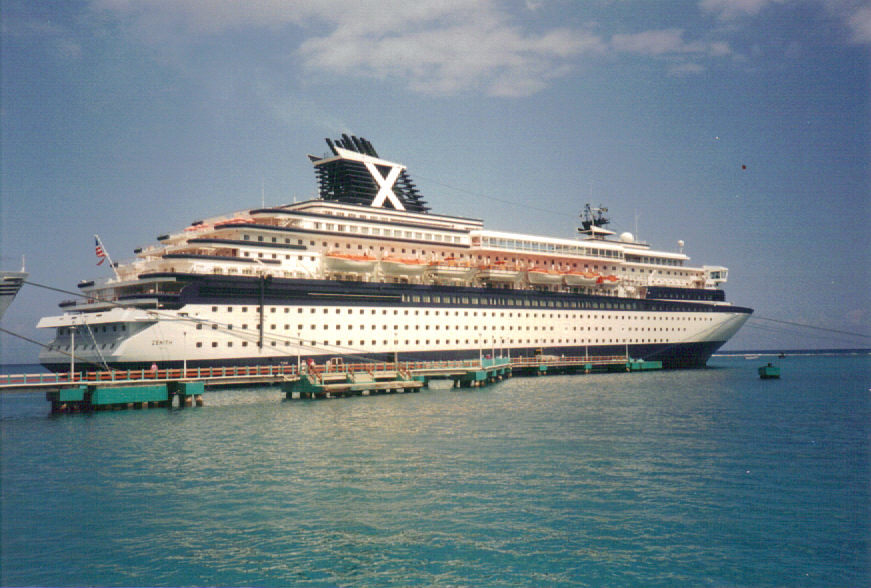
Celebrity's first class of new builds included the 1992 built Zenith

Celebrity Cruise's second ship Horizon, which had been ordered in 1988 as a replacement for Amerikanis in the Chandris Fantasy fleet, was transferred to Celebrity Cruises fleet, entering service in May 1990. It would be the line's first purpose-built new build. In late 1990 Celebrity Cruises placed an order for a sister ship of the Horizon, delivered in 1992 as Zenith.

==== Century class debut ====
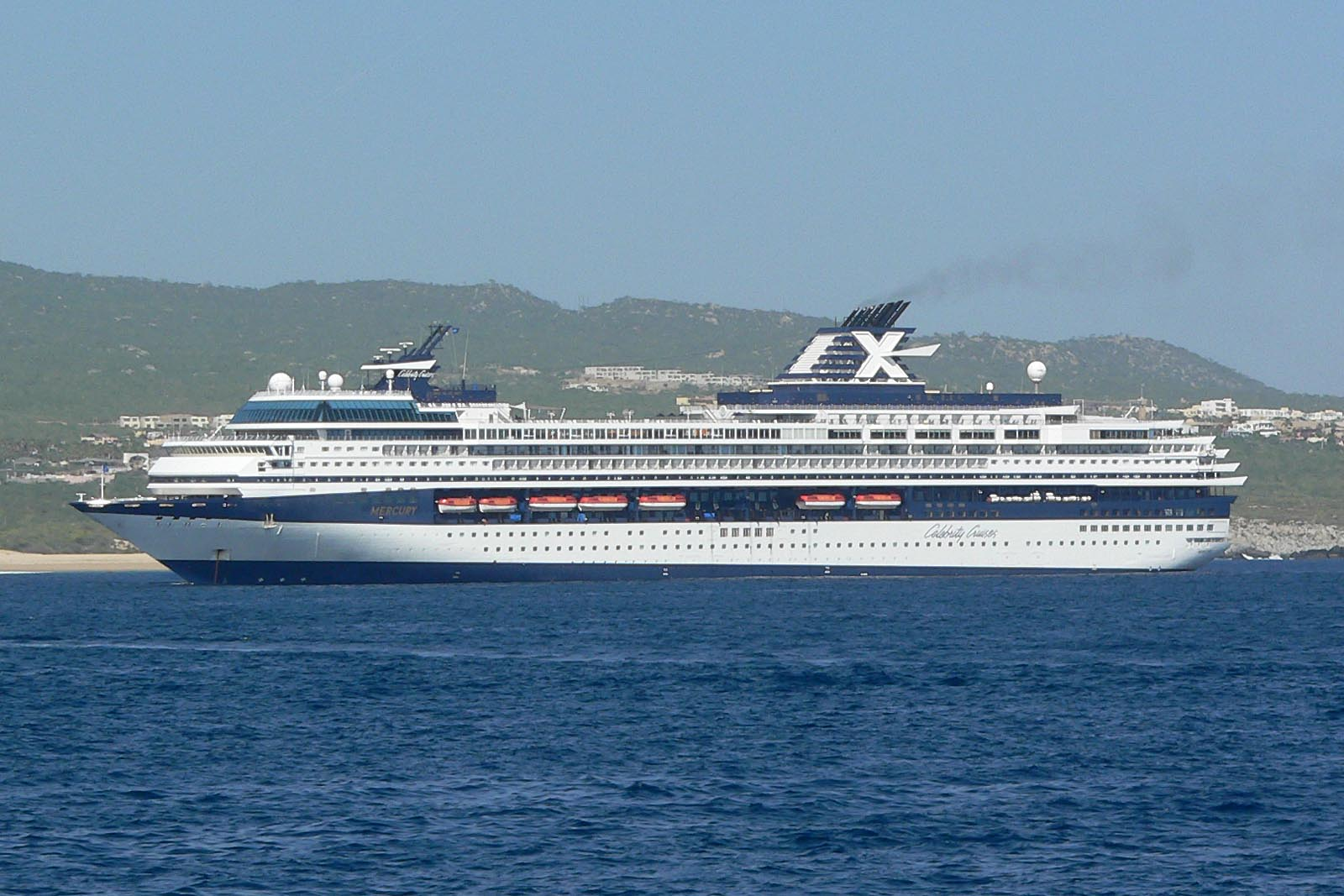
The Mercury, third ship in the Century class

Celebrity ordered a trio of newbuilds at Meyer Werft, known as the Century class, with the first ship, the Century debuting in 1996, followed by the Galaxy and Mercury. These would be the last ships designed under the Chandris family management.

=== Royal Caribbean Group (1997–present) ===
In 1997, the Chandris family sold its interests in Celebrity Cruises to Royal Caribbean Cruise Line, leading to the formation of Royal Caribbean Cruises Ltd. (later Royal Caribbean Group) as a holding company to keep both brands separate and the renaming of Royal Caribbean Cruise Line to Royal Caribbean International. Following the delivery of the Mercury, the lines first ship, the Meridian, was sold to Singapore-based Sun Cruises.

==== Millennium class debut ====
Summit in Celebrity's short lived second generation livery

Between 2000 and 2002, Celebrity took delivery of a quartet of new ships, the first gas turbine-powered cruise ships, and aptly named Millennium-class ships Millennium, Infinity, Summit and Constellation. The new class of ship introduced a new hull livery, with dark blue hull, gold stripes, and red accents on the mast and funnel. The livery was short Iived, and after a few years, would revert to Celebrity's original white hull, dark blue stripe color scheme.

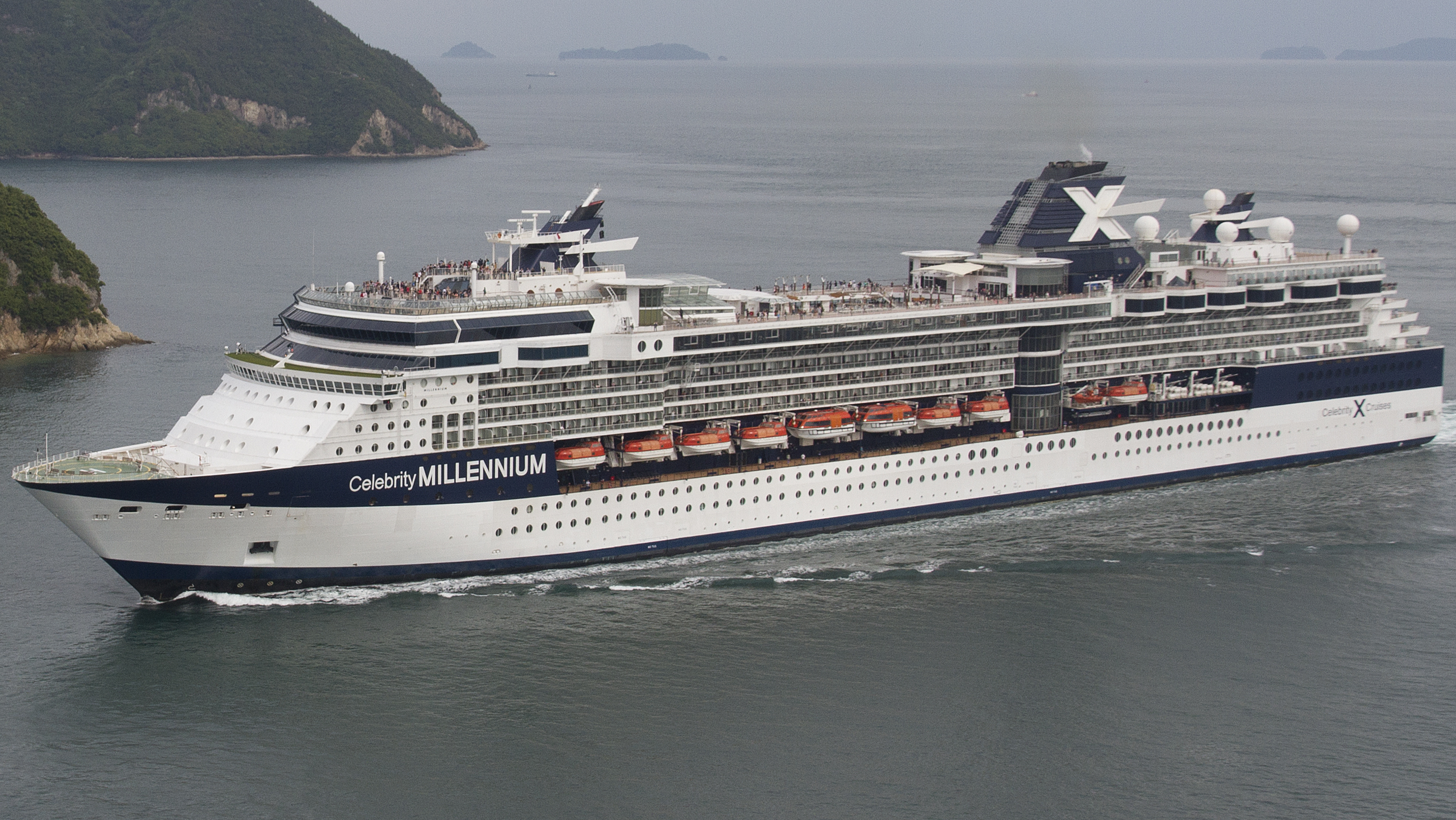
Celebrity Millennium, the lead ship in the Millennium class in reverted classic Celebrity livery.

The Celebrity Expeditions sub-brand was launched in 2001 with the acquisition of Celebrity Xpedition, a small boutique ship offering specialized cruises around the Galápagos Islands. In 2005, the Horizon was transferred to the fleet of Royal Caribbean's United Kingdom-based subsidiary Island Cruises. In the same year, the first ship of what was to be named Solstice class was ordered from Meyer Werft. By 2007, three more ships of this class were on order.

In 2006, plans were made to transfer Blue Moon and Blue Dream from the fleet of Pullmantur Cruises to Celebrity Cruises under the names of Celebrity Quest and Celebrity Journey. The ships would have joined the Celebrity Expeditions sub-brand, but in the end the decision was made to form an entirely new line, Azamara Cruises, to operate these ships in 2007. Also, in 2007, the Zenith was transferred to Pullmantur Cruises 'in exchange' for the Azamara ships. Transfer of the Zenith also meant the end of Celebrity Cruises' association with Bermuda for the time being, as no ship was brought in to replace her on the cruises to Bermuda. In April 2010, The Celebrity Summit began to reposition yearly to New Jersey to offer cruises to Bermuda.

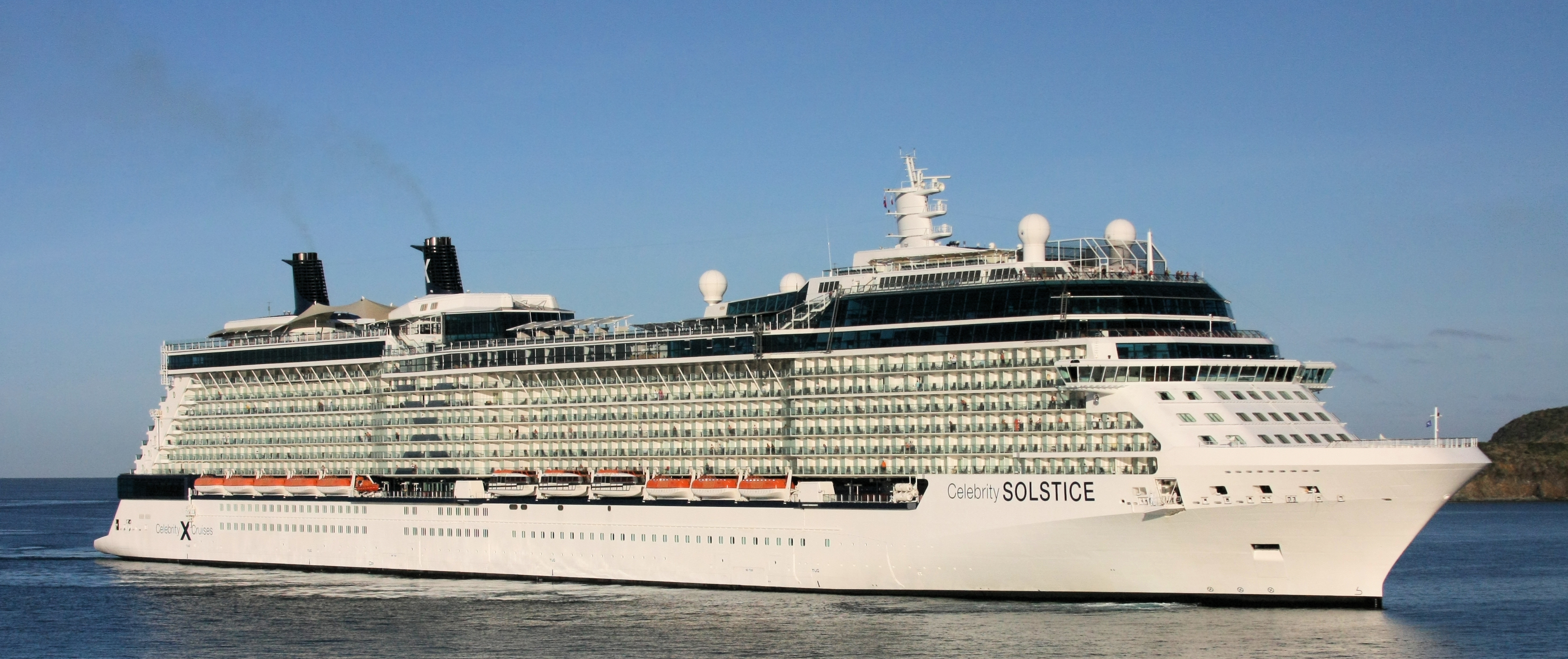
Celebrity Solstice, the lead ship in the Solstice class

In 2007–2008, all Celebrity Cruises' ships were renamed with a "Celebrity" prefix added to the pre-existing ship names.

==== Solstice class debut ====
Celebrity Solstice, the first ship in the new Solstice class, was delivered to Celebrity on 24 October 2008. In May 2009 Galaxy was transferred to the fleet of TUI Cruises, a joint venture between Celebrity Cruises' owner Royal Caribbean Group and TUI AG and renamed as Mein Schiff. Two more Solstice-class ships entered service – the Celebrity Equinox in 2009 and the Celebrity Eclipse in 2010.

In 2011, Celebrity Mercury was sold by Celebrity fleet to become Mein Schiff 2 for TUI Cruises. The fourth Solstice-class ship the Celebrity Silhouette entered service in 2011. The Celebrity Reflection was delivered in 2012.

In 2014, Celebrity Cruises launched a blog called "Catalyst," which covered travel, fashion, and culture.

In April 2015, Celebrity's oldest ship, the Celebrity Century, departed the fleet.

==== Edge class debut ====
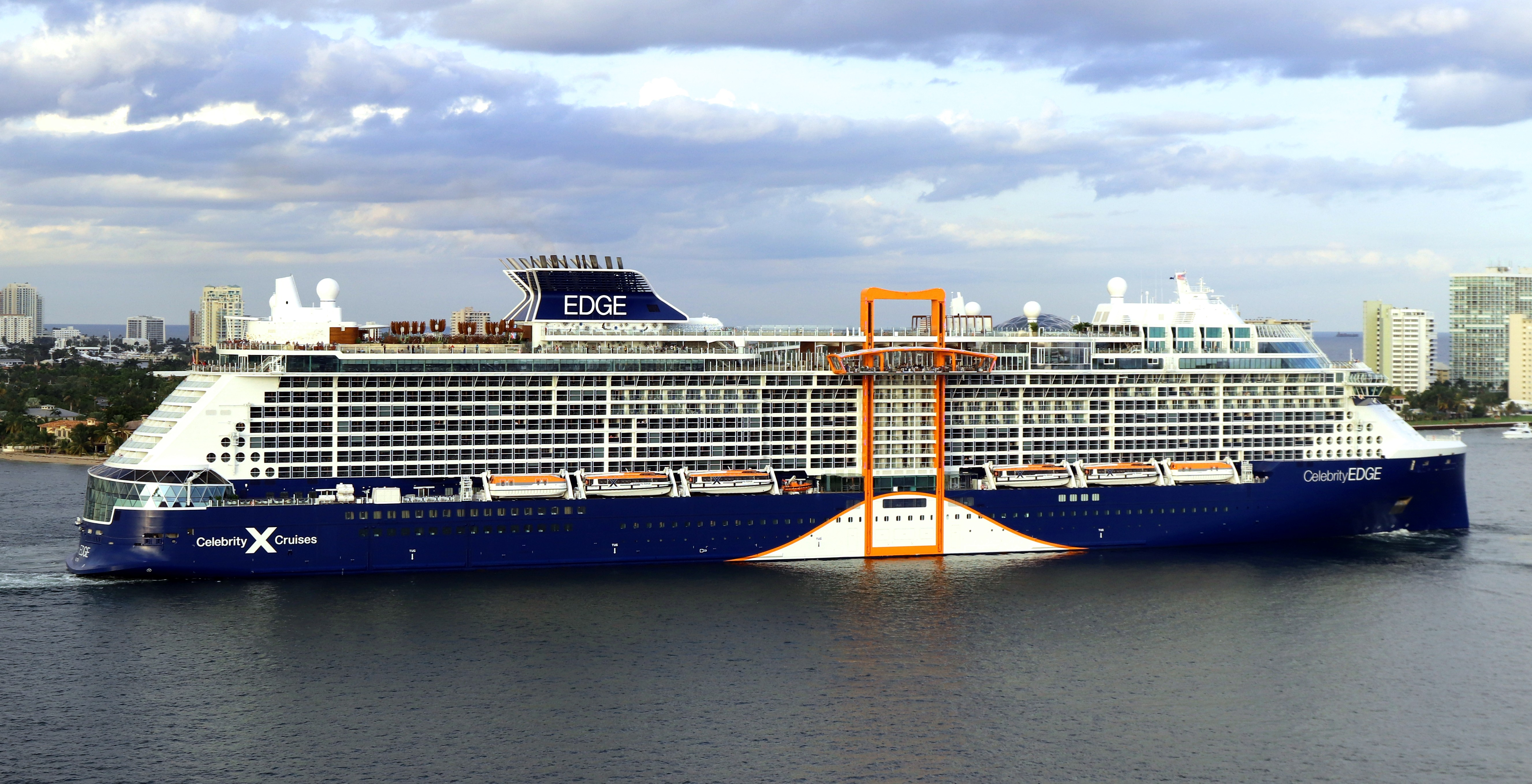
Celebrity Edge, the lead ship in the Edge class

On 4 December 2014, Celebrity Cruises signed a letter of intent for a new class of vessels. The two 2,900-guest, 117,000 GT ships would be developed under the project name EDGE and will build upon the brand's Millennium-class and Solstice-class vessels. The company took delivery of the first Edge-class vessel, the Celebrity Edge, on 31 October 2018, followed by the Celebrity Apex in 2020, and enlarged stretched Edge-class Celebrity Beyond in 2022. The Edge class introduced a new livery for the brand, with blue painted hulls that would be incorporated on the rest of the fleet as part of the Celebrity revolution initiative.

In December 2014, Lisa Lutoff-Perlo, a 32-year veteran of Celebrity Cruises, was promoted to president and chief executive officer.

On 14 March 2016, Celebrity Cruises announced the planned acquisition of the Galápagos Islands tour operator Ocean Adventures and its two ships, the 48-guest MV Eclipse (now Celebrity Xperience) and the 16-guest catamaran MC Athala II (now Celebrity Xploration). The move expanded Celebrity's guest capacity in the Galápagos by 65 percent.

Celebrity Cruises announced on 11 October 2017, that it would perform legal same-sex marriages on its ships while in international waters following the legalization of same-sex marriage in Malta, where most of the Celebrity fleet is registered. The company already hosted same-sex marriages while docked in jurisdictions where they are legal, but the change in Maltese law allowed the company's captains to perform legally-recognized marriages while in international waters.

In July 2018, the company announced its intention to invest more than $500 million to refurbish all Millennium-class and Solstice-class ships in its fleet between 2019 and 2023.

In 2020, due to the worldwide COVID-19 pandemic, sailings were suspended on various dates in various regions. On 12 January 2021, a report indicated that sailings were suspended worldwide "through April 30, including the May 1 transatlantic cruise on Celebrity Apex". Between May and October 2021, "Europe and transatlantic cruises on Celebrity Edge and Celebrity Constellation will also be suspended May through Oct. 2021".

On 19 March 2021, Celebrity Cruises announced that it would be resuming its North American cruises in June, sailing out of St. Maarten and that to board all adults, including crew, will be required to show proof of COVID-19 vaccination. Children were allowed to show evidence of a negative COVID-19 test within 72 hours. On 26 June, Celebrity Edge became the first cruise ship to leave the United States with ticketed passengers since March 2020. It set sail from Port Everglades in Fort Lauderdale, Florida.

==== Project Nirvana ====
In November 2024, it was announced by Celebrity president Laura Hodges Bethge that the line was working on a new class design titled "Project Nirvana", with a potential debut in 2030.

In January 2025, Celebrity announced that they ordered a 6th Edge Class ship.

==== Celebrity River Cruises ====
On January 28, 2025, Celebrity announced Celebrity River Cruises with an order of 10 transformative ships that with an "elevated design and sophistication of the Edge Series". The ships are being built at the TeamCo Shipyard, the Netherlands, with the first ships debuting in 2027 sailing on the Rhine and Danube.

In September 2025, it was announced the names of the first two new river ships to be Celebrity Compass and Celebrity Seeker as part of an official press release showing itineraries, deck plans, and the first images of the new ships.

== Fleet ==
=== Current fleet ===
Ship	Entered service for Celebrity	Shipyard	Capacity	Gross tonnage	Flag	Notes	Image
Millennium class (M class)
Celebrity Millennium	2000	Chantiers de l'Atlantique, France	2,137	91,000 GT	Malta	Previously Millennium, renamed in 2008. Last renovated in 2019.	
Celebrity Infinity	2001	Chantiers de l'Atlantique, France	2,170	91,000 GT	Malta	Previously Infinity, renamed in 2007. Last renovated in 2013. Planned 2020 updates cancelled.	
Celebrity Summit	2001	Chantiers de l'Atlantique, France	2,158	91,000 GT	Malta	Previously Summit, renamed in 2008. Last renovated in 2019.	
Celebrity Constellation	2002	Chantiers de l'Atlantique, France	2,170	91,000 GT	Malta	Previously Constellation, renamed in 2007. Last renovated in 2013. Planned 2020 updates cancelled.	
Solstice class (S class)
Celebrity Solstice	2008	Meyer Werft, Germany	2,850	121,878 GT	Malta	Lead ship of Solstice-class. Full modernisation completed March 2026. [76]	
Celebrity Equinox	2009	Meyer Werft, Germany	2,850	121,878 GT	Malta	Last renovated in 2019.	
Celebrity Eclipse	2010	Meyer Werft, Germany	2,850	121,878 GT	Malta		
Celebrity Silhouette	2011	Meyer Werft, Germany	2,886	122,210 GT	Malta	Last renovated in 2020.	
Celebrity Reflection	2012	Meyer Werft, Germany	3,046	125,366 GT	Malta	Last dry dock in 2022.	
Edge class
Celebrity Edge	2018	Chantiers de l'Atlantique, France	2,918	130,818 GT	Malta		
Celebrity Apex	2020	Chantiers de l'Atlantique, France	2,910	130,818 GT	Malta		
Celebrity Beyond	2022	Chantiers de l'Atlantique, France	3,260	141,420 GT	Malta		
Celebrity Ascent	2023	Chantiers de l'Atlantique, France	3,260	141,420 GT	Malta		
Celebrity Xcel	2025	Chantiers de l'Atlantique, France	3,260	141,420 GT	Malta		
Expedition vessel
Celebrity Flora	2019	Shipyard De Hoop, Netherlands	100	5,739 GT	Ecuador		

=== Future fleet ===
A new class named Nirvana is planned, and Celebrity has announced they are building ships for the river cruising market, expected to start service in 2027:

Ship	Class	Shipyard	Enters service with Celebrity	Capacity	Gross tonnage	Flag	Notes
Celebrity Xcite	Edge	Chantiers de l'Atlantique, France	2028	3,200	141,400 GT	Malta	Sister ship to Celebrity Xcel; Steel cutting October 23, 2025
TBA	Project Nirvana	TBA	2030	TBA	TBA	Malta	New Class of ship

==== River Fleet ====
Ship	Class	Shipyard	Enters service with Celebrity	Capacity	Gross tonnage	Flag	Notes
Celebrity Compass	"River Class"	TeamCo Shipyard, Netherlands	2027	180	TBA	TBA	New river class of ship.
Celebrity Seeker	"River Class"	TeamCo Shipyard, Netherlands	2027	180	TBA	TBA	
Celebrity Wanderer	"River Class"	TeamCo Shipyard, Netherlands	2028	180	TBA	TBA	
Celebrity Roamer	"River Class"	TeamCo Shipyard, Netherlands	2028	180	TBA	TBA	
Celebrity Boundless	"River Class"	TeamCo Shipyard, Netherlands	2028	180	TBA	TBA	
TBA	"River Class"	TeamCo Shipyard, Netherlands	2028	180	TBA	TBA	
TBA	"River Class"	TeamCo Shipyard, Netherlands	2029	180	TBA	TBA	
TBA	"River Class"	TeamCo Shipyard, Netherlands	2029	180	TBA	TBA	
TBA	"River Class"	TeamCo Shipyard, Netherlands	2029	180	TBA	TBA	
TBA	"River Class"	TeamCo Shipyard, Netherlands	2029	180	TBA	TBA	

In January 2026, ten more ships were announced to be built until 2031; a fleet of 20 vessels in 2031 is planned.

=== Former fleet ===
Ship	Class	Years in service	Tonnage*	Status after Celebrity	Image
Meridian		1990–1997	30,440 GRT	From 1997 to 1999, Sun Vista for Sun Cruises. Burned and sank in the Straits of Malacca in May 1999.	
Horizon	Horizon class	1990–2005	46,811 GT	From 2005 to 2009, Island Star for Island Cruises. From 2009 to 2012, Horizon for Pullmantur Cruises. From 2012 to 2017, L'Horizon for CDF Croisières de France. From 2017 to 2020, Horizon for Pullmantur Cruises. Scrapped at Aliağa in 2022 as Ori.	
Zenith	Horizon class	1992–2007	47,255 GT	From 2007 to 2014, Zenith for Pullmantur Cruises. From 2014 to 2017, Zenith for CDF Croisières de France. From 2017 to 2020, Zenith for Pullmantur Cruises. From 2020 to 2022, The Zenith for Peace Boat. From 2022 to 2022, TSM Singapore. Scrapped at Alang in 2022 as Singa.	
Celebrity Galaxy	Century class	1996–2009	76,522 GT	Galaxy from 1996 to 2008. From 2009 to 2010, Mein Schiff for TUI Cruises. Renamed Mein Schiff 1 in 2010 and operated for TUI until 2018. From 2018 onwards, Marella Explorer for Marella Cruises.	
Celebrity Mercury	Century class	1997–2011	77,713 GT	Mercury from 1997 to 2008; From 2011 to 2019, Mein Schiff 2 for TUI Cruises. Renamed Mein Schiff Herz in 2019. From 2023 onwards, Marella Voyager for Marella Cruises	
Celebrity Century	Century class	1995–2015	71,545 GT	Century from 1995 to 2008; From 2015 to 2019, SkySea Golden Era for Sky Sea Cruise Line. From 2019 onwards, Marella Explorer 2 for Marella Cruises.	
Celebrity Xperience		2017–2019	1,610 GT	Operated as Eclipse for Ocean Adventures until 2016. Integrated into Celebrity's fleet in March 2017. First reported to likely be sold in November 2017. Replaced by Celebrity Xpedition in 2019 following Xpedition's re-entry into service.	
Celebrity Xpedition		2001–2025	2,842 GT	Capacity reduced from 100 to 48 in 2019 to meet Ecuador permit requirements. Sold to Lindblad Expeditions in early 2025 (National Geographic Gemini)	
Celebrity Xploration		2017–2025	319.5 GT	Operated as Athala II for Ocean Adventures until 2016. Sold to Lindblad Expeditions in early 2025 (National Geographic Delfina)	
