= Celebrity Beyond =

Passenger cruise ship launched in 2021

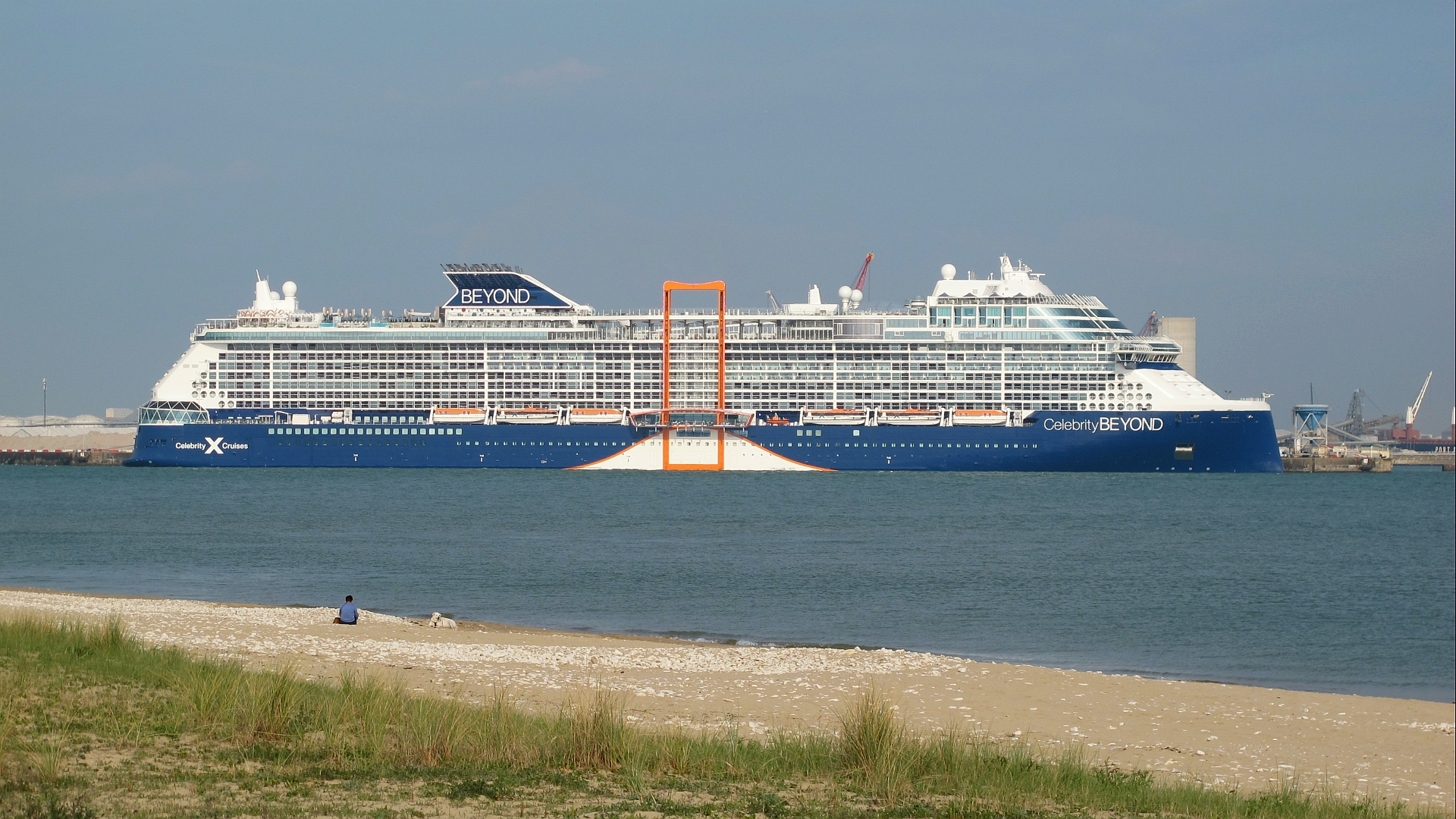
- Celebrity Beyond in La Rochelle, France on April 29, 2022

History

Malta
- Name: Celebrity Beyond
- Owner: Celebrity Beyond LLC. (Royal Caribbean Group)
- Operator: Celebrity Cruises
- Port of registry: Valletta, Malta
- Ordered: 16 May 2016
- Builder: Chantiers de l'Atlantique
- Yard number: L34
- Laid down: 5 October 2018
- Launched: 31 March 2021
- Sponsored by: Simone Biles
- Christened: 4 November 2022
- Acquired: 6 April 2022
- Maiden voyage: 27 April 2022
- In service: 21 April 2022
- Identification: IMO number: 9838395; MMSI number: 215808000; Callsign: 9HA5296
- Status: In service

General characteristics
- Class & type: Edge-class cruise ship
- Tonnage: 141,420 GT
- Length: 326.5 m (1,071 ft 2 in)
- Beam: 39.5 m (129 ft 7 in)
- Height: 57.9 m (190 ft 0 in) (New Panamax)
- Draught: 8.5 m (27 ft 11 in)
- Decks: 21
- Installed power: 2 × Wärtsilä W12V46F; 2 × Wärtsilä W8L46F; 1 × Wärtsilä W12V32
- Propulsion: 2 × ABB azipod 4 x tunnel thruster
- Speed: 22.6 knots (41.9 km/h; 26.0 mph)
- Capacity: 3,260 passengers (double occupancy); 3,937 passengers (maximum)
- Crew: 1,416

Celebrity Beyond is a cruise ship owned by Celebrity Cruises, taking its name from the company's slogan. The third in the Edge class, the ship was constructed at the Chantiers de l'Atlantique shipyard, and entered service in April 2022. The ship was captained from 2022 to 2025 by Kate McCue.

== Background and design ==
On 25 May 2016, Royal Caribbean Cruises Ltd., parent company of Celebrity, announced that it had signed a memorandum of understanding with the STX Corporation (then owners of Chantiers) for the third and fourth ships of the Edge class.

Like other Edge-class ships, Celebrity Beyond features Eden, a 270-degree, three-deck observation lounge which features a ramp connecting decks 5 and 6, in addition to a cafe, a bar, and a dining venue.

The ship is also fitted with the Magic Carpet tender dock, designed to prevent hull collisions while anchored offshore. While sailing, the Magic Carpet is equipped with a bar and can be used as a patio, when positioned at three different decks (Decks 5, 14, and 16).

The ship features a spa and a fitness centre that overlooks the sea from above the wheelhouse.

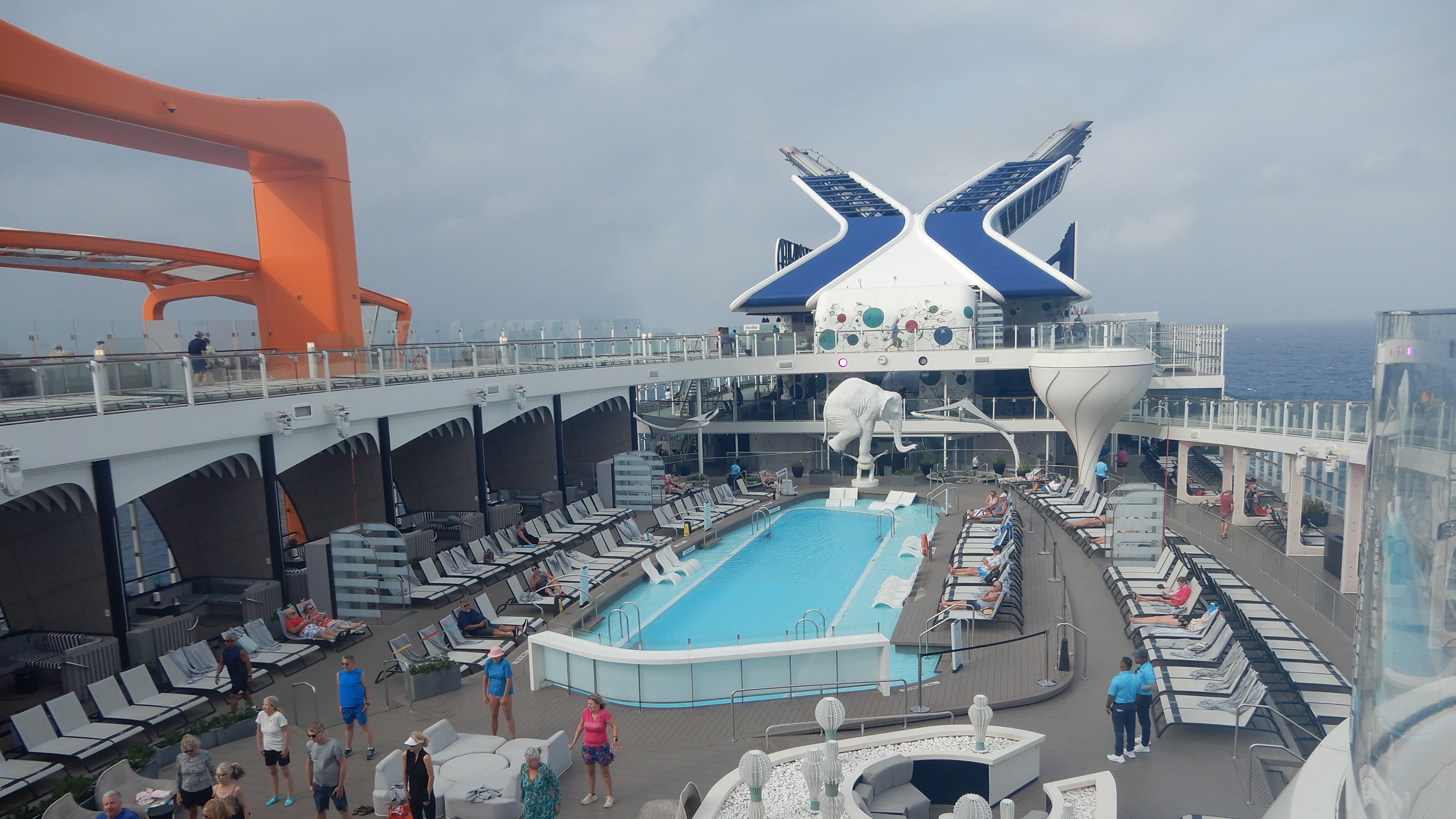
The swimming pool on the Celebrity Beyond in March 2025

Celebrity Beyond was the first in the Celebrity fleet to be equipped with SpaceX Starlink internet connections. The service launched on the 5 September 2022 "Celebrate With the CEO" cruise.

== Construction and career ==
Steel cutting for Celebrity Beyond occurred on 28 January 2020, at which point Celebrity confirmed the ship's name. At the same time, it was reported that the ship, and sister ship Celebrity Ascent, would be an evolution in the Edge-class design and feature an increase in gross tonnage, length, and passenger capacity.

In August 2020, it was announced that the delivery of Celebrity Beyond (as well as that of Wonder of the Seas) would be delayed by approximately 10 months due to shipyard closures and delays caused by the COVID-19 pandemic.

On 19 November 2020, the keel for Celebrity Beyond was laid down.

The ship arrived in Southampton on 21 April 2022 for its maiden voyage on 27 April to Barcelona. This initial itinerary called at La Rochelle, Bilbao, Lisbon, Cadiz, Malaga, Palma and concluded in Barcelona.

On 10 May 2022, Celebrity Cruises announced that gymnast Simone Biles will be the godmother of the ship. The christening ceremony was held in Florida on 4 November 2022.

On 19 July 2025, the ship suffered major engine troubles that delayed her entry into Miami by 7 hours causing Celebrity to cancel the following cruise on the 20th.

== Notable captains ==
Captain Kate McCue was the captain of Celebrity Beyond from April 21, 2022, to February 24, 2025. She was the first captain of Celebrity Beyond. In an announcement made on Instagram, she bid farewell to the company. "Today, I say farewell to Celebrity," she begins, "I've spent the last 22 years on 11 ships in the Royal Caribbean Group, from 2nd Officer to Captain." McCue was the first American woman to captain a "Mega" cruise ship.
