= Celebrity Edge =

Edge-class cruise ship

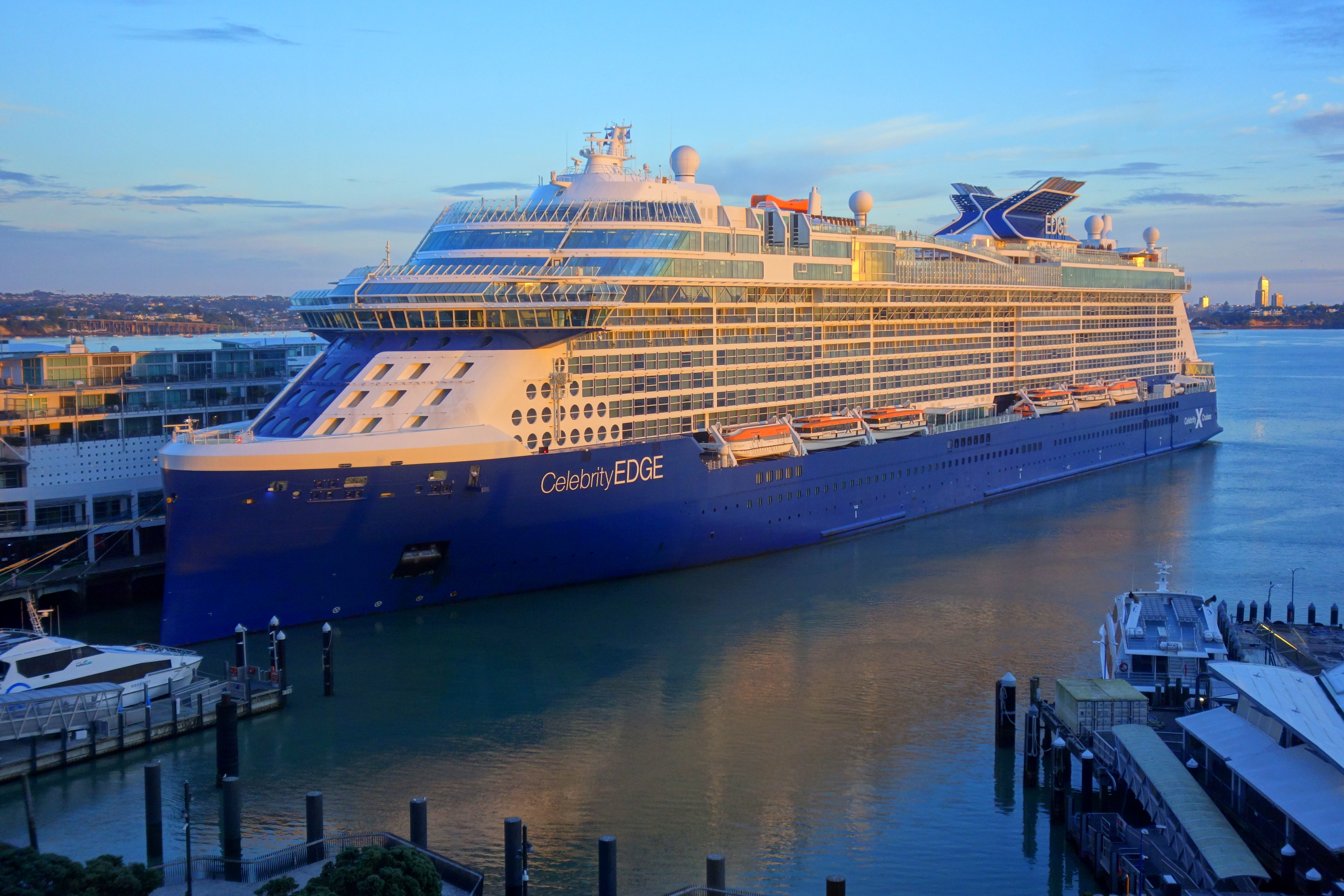
- Celebrity Edge in Auckland, 2024

History

Malta
- Name: Celebrity Edge
- Owner: Celebrity Edge Inc. (Royal Caribbean Group)
- Operator: Celebrity Cruises
- Port of registry: Valletta, Malta
- Builder: STX France
- Cost: US$1 billion (2014) (equivalent to US$1.3 billion in 2024)
- Yard number: J34
- Laid down: 21 November 2016
- Launched: 23 January 2018
- Sponsored by: Malala Yousafzai
- Completed: 31 October 2018
- Maiden voyage: 9 December 2018
- Identification: IMO number: 9812705; MMSI number: 248325000; Callsign: 9HA4612
- Status: In service

General characteristics
- Class & type: Edge-class cruise ship
- Type: Passenger ship
- Tonnage: 130,818 GT
- Length: 306 m (1,003 ft 11 in)
- Beam: 39 m (127 ft 11 in)
- Draft: 8.4 m (27 ft 7 in)
- Decks: 15
- Installed power: 2 × Wärtsilä 8L46F (2 × 9.6MW); 2 × Wärtsilä 12V46F (2 × 14.4MW); 1 × Wärtsilä 12V32E (1 × 6.96MW)
- Propulsion: 2 × ABB Azipod; 4 × Brunvoll FU115 tunnel thruster
- Speed: 21.8 knots (40.4 km/h; 25.1 mph)
- Capacity: 2,918
- Crew: 1,377

Celebrity Edge is an Edge-class cruise ship operated by Celebrity Cruises, a subsidiary of Royal Caribbean Group. After the new vessel was ordered with French shipbuilder STX France in December 2014, her keel was laid in June 2017 and she was floated out in January 2018. Upon delivery in October 2018, at 130,818 GT, she became the lead ship of the Edge class and the largest ship by gross tonnage to have joined the Celebrity fleet.

== Design ==
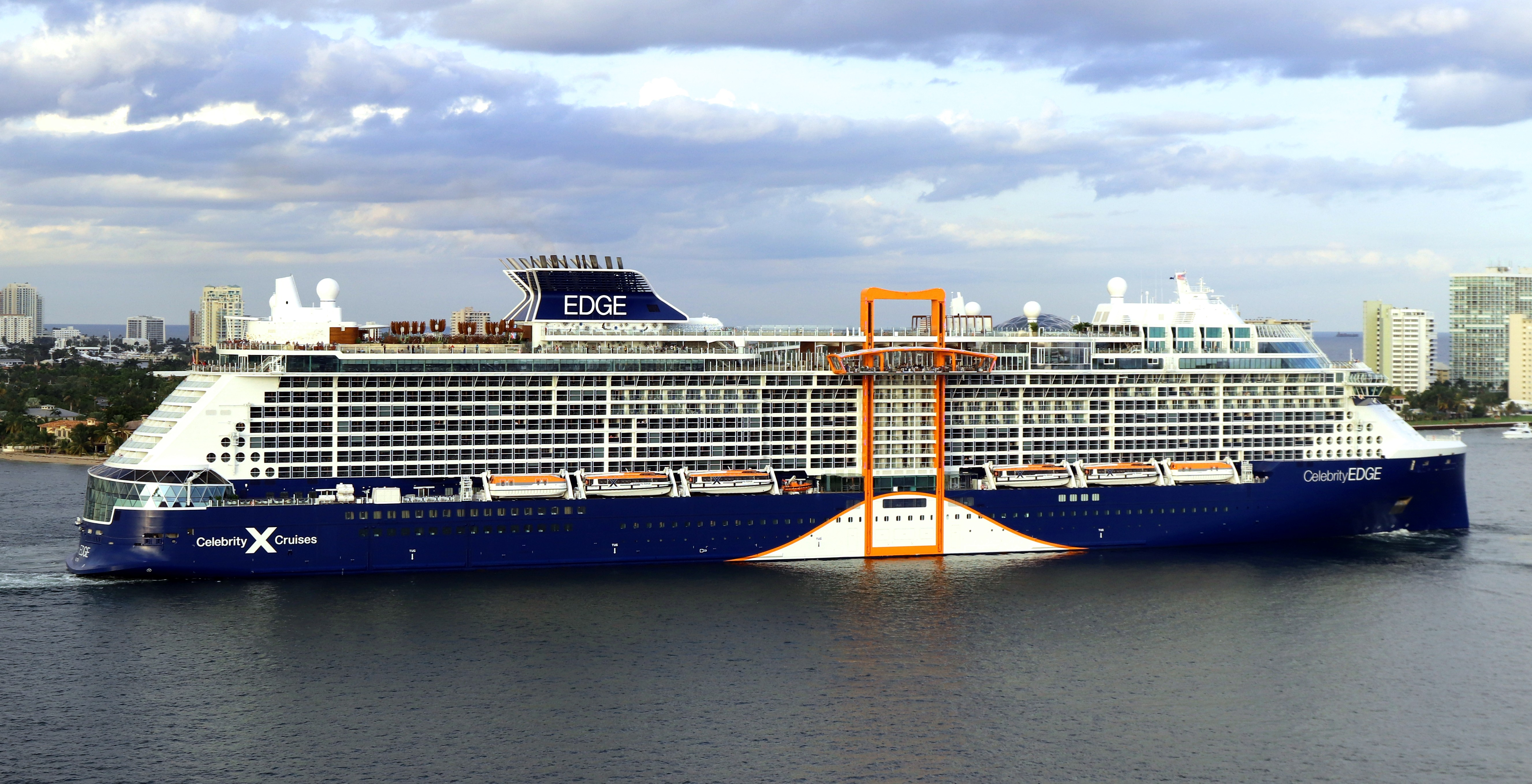
The orange "Magic Carpet" along the starboard side of Celebrity Edge

Celebrity Edge was the first Celebrity ship to be equipped with what the cruise line dubs the "Magic Carpet," a tangerine glass-sheltered platform that protrudes and is suspended from the starboard side of the vessel. It was designed to facilitate more accessible tender embarkation and disembarkation. When not in use as a tender platform, it can rise or descend alongside the ship on its track and otherwise hosts additional dining and lounge space.

Most balcony staterooms on the ship also incorporate the outward patio of the balcony into the stateroom by moving the steel superstructure of the ship inward. Royal Caribbean Group CEO Richard Fain explained the motive behind the design as intending to provide passengers more living area while also allowing passengers to be closer to the edge of the ship while on their patios.

The ship's bow is designed to maximize fuel efficiency by having a parabolic shape that vertically rises towards the decks. It provides extra sheathing for the bulbous bow and the propellers to reduce drag.

== Construction ==
On 4 December 2014, Celebrity Cruises' parent company, Royal Caribbean Cruises Ltd., announced that they had finalized an order with French shipbuilder STX France for two new ships that would compose a new class of vessels for the Celebrity fleet. Classified as "Project EDGE" during development, the two new ships were planned to be at approximately 117,000 GT each, with a guest capacity of 2,900 passengers. Deliveries were planned for fall 2018 and early-2020 for the two vessels, respectively. Each ship was reported to come at a cost of US$1 billion (2014) (equivalent to US$1.3 billion in 2024) .

STX France began preparing construction for the first new Edge-class vessel with the steel-cutting ceremony on 21 November 2016 at its shipyard in Saint-Nazaire, France. On the same day, Celebrity announced the name of the first newbuild as Celebrity Edge, and her sister ship as Celebrity Beyond, which was later changed to Celebrity Apex in July 2018.

Six months after the steel-cutting, Celebrity Edge had her keel laying and coin ceremony at STX France on 21 June 2017. She was officially launched on 23 January 2018, marking her float-out from the shipyard. On 27 July 2018, she began her first round of sea trials and completed them four days later, on 1 August. Her second and final round of sea trials were performed in September 2018. Celebrity Edge was delivered on 31 October 2018.

== Service history ==
Following her delivery, Celebrity Edge jump-started her inaugural season on 6 November 2018 with a transatlantic crossing from France to Port Everglades in Fort Lauderdale, Florida. As a result of construction progressing faster than expected, Celebrity released four three-day preview cruises for sale upon the ship's arrival in Florida: 21 November, 24 November, 1 December, and 6 December.

Celebrity named 2014 Nobel Peace laureate Malala Yousafzai as the godmother to Celebrity Edge in April 2017 and Yousafzai christened the ship in a ceremony on 4 December 2018. The ship's official maiden voyage sailed on 9 December 2018, calling in the ports of Key West, Grand Cayman, and Costa Maya.

Since December 2018, Celebrity Edge has been homeported at Port Everglades, operating weekly Eastern and Western Caribbean sailings during the winter season, and sailing in the Mediterranean during the summer season.

In November 2022, Celebrity opened the 2023 Alaskan Cruising Season and announced Celebrity Edge would be on the Alaskan cruises. Then Celebrity Edge moved to service the 2023/2024 Australia/New Zealand circuit, and returned to the Alaskan circuit in May 2024.
