= Mein Schiff =

Mein Schiff (German, 'My Ship') may refer to the following ships:

- Marella Explorer, formerly Mein Schiff and later Mein Schiff 1
- Mein Schiff 1, the name of two ships
- Mein Schiff 2, the name of two ships
- Mein Schiff 3
- Mein Schiff 4
- Mein Schiff 5
- Mein Schiff 6
- Mein Schiff Herz

== See also ==
- TUI Cruises § Fleet
