= Mein Schiff 1 =

Two ships have been named Mein Schiff 1,

- Mein Schiff 1 (2010) launched in 1996, served under this name between 2010 and 2018
- Mein Schiff 1 (2018) launched in 2018

== See also ==
- Mein Schiff
- TUI Cruises#Fleet
