= Tor Bay =

Bay in Devon, England

Coordinates: 50°26′N 3°30′W

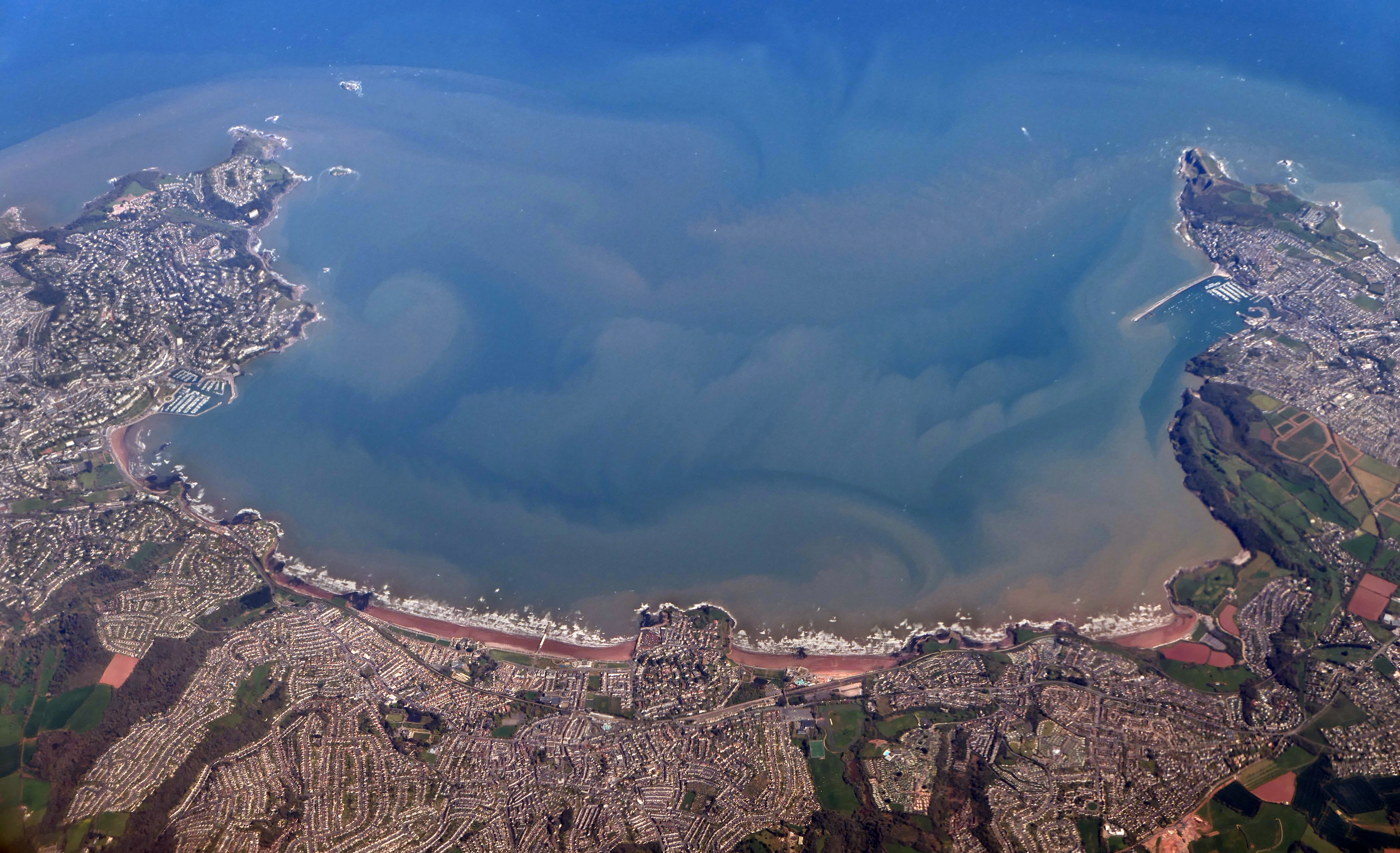
- Aerial view of Tor Bay

- Location within Devon
- Location: South-east coast of Devon, England
- Max. width: 4.5 mi (7.2 km)

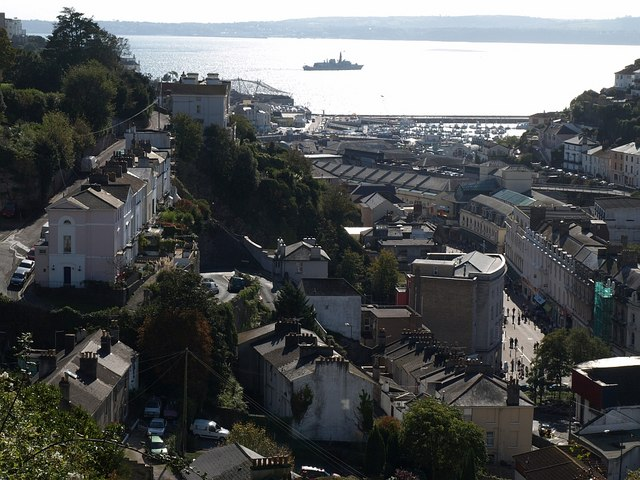
View southwards from Torquay towards Tor Bay

Tor Bay (sometimes written as Torbay) is a bay on the south-east coast of the county of Devon, England. Facing east into the English Channel, it is about 4.5 mi (7.2 km) wide from north to south. The settlements of Torquay, Paignton and Brixham, which lie along its coastline, are known collectively as Torbay.

== Geology ==
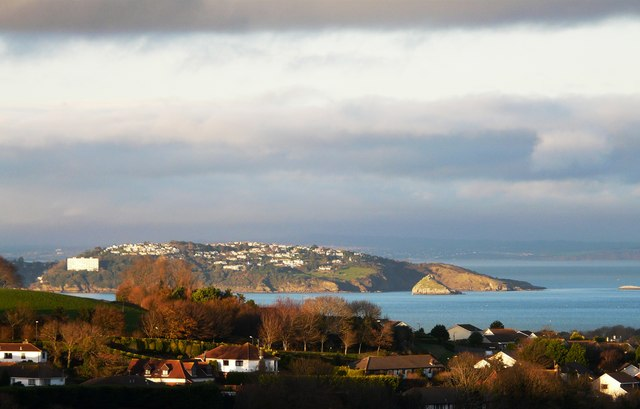
A view north across Tor Bay from Brixham

Tor Bay is bounded by outcrops of Devonian limestone forming its northern limit at Hope's Nose and its southern at Berry Head. The geology of the area is varied and complex, recognised by the 2007 designation of the English Riviera Geopark which includes all of Tor Bay's coastline.

During the last glacial period, when sea level was much lower, Tor Bay was dry land, as is shown by the existence of a submerged forest in the bay. It was overwhelmed during the Flandrian transgression which started about 10,000 years ago.

== History ==
Because it is sheltered from the prevailing south-westerly winds, Tor Bay has long been one of the safest refuges for shipping between Land's End and the Isle of Wight. In the mid-17th century, the bay was occasionally used by the naval fleet as an anchorage and as a gathering place for convoys. These uses were greatly expanded during the wars with France up to 1815, though the bay's exposure to easterly winds caused a number of near disasters when the wind changed direction unexpectedly.

On 5 November 1688 William of Orange landed at Brixham, starting the Glorious Revolution.

During the COVID-19 pandemic, restrictions on the cruise industry led to Tor Bay being used as a layup location to anchor numerous cruise ships including five Holland America vessels, as well as Tui ships Marella Explorer and Marella Explorer 2. Cunard anchored ships in nearby Babbacombe Bay.

== Navigation and tourism ==
The bay contains two sheltered harbours, at Torquay and Brixham. Almost the whole of the bay affords good anchorages and shelter from westerly winds. The bay's sheltered nature makes it a popular location for watersports. There are regular passenger ferry services across the bay between Torquay and Brixham.
