= Mein Schiff 2 =

Two ships have been named Mein Schiff 2,

- Mein Schiff 2 (2011) launched in 1997, served under this name between 2011 and 2018
- Mein Schiff 2 (2018) launched in 2018

== See also ==
- Mein Schiff
- TUI Cruises#Fleet
