= Legend of the Seas (disambiguation) =

Legend of the Seas is a planned 2026 Icon-class cruise ship in the Royal Caribbean fleet. It may also refer to:

- Marella Discovery 2, lead ship of the Vision class of cruise ships, originally operated by Royal Caribbean International as Legend of the Seas from 1995–2017
- Sinbad: Legend of the Seven Seas, a 2003 American animated fantasy adventure film produced by DreamWorks Animation
