= MV Mercury =

MV Mercury may refer to:

- MV Mercury (1945), a coaster
- MV Mercury (1997), a cruise ship
