= Century-class cruise ship =

Class of cruise ships belonging to Marella Cruises

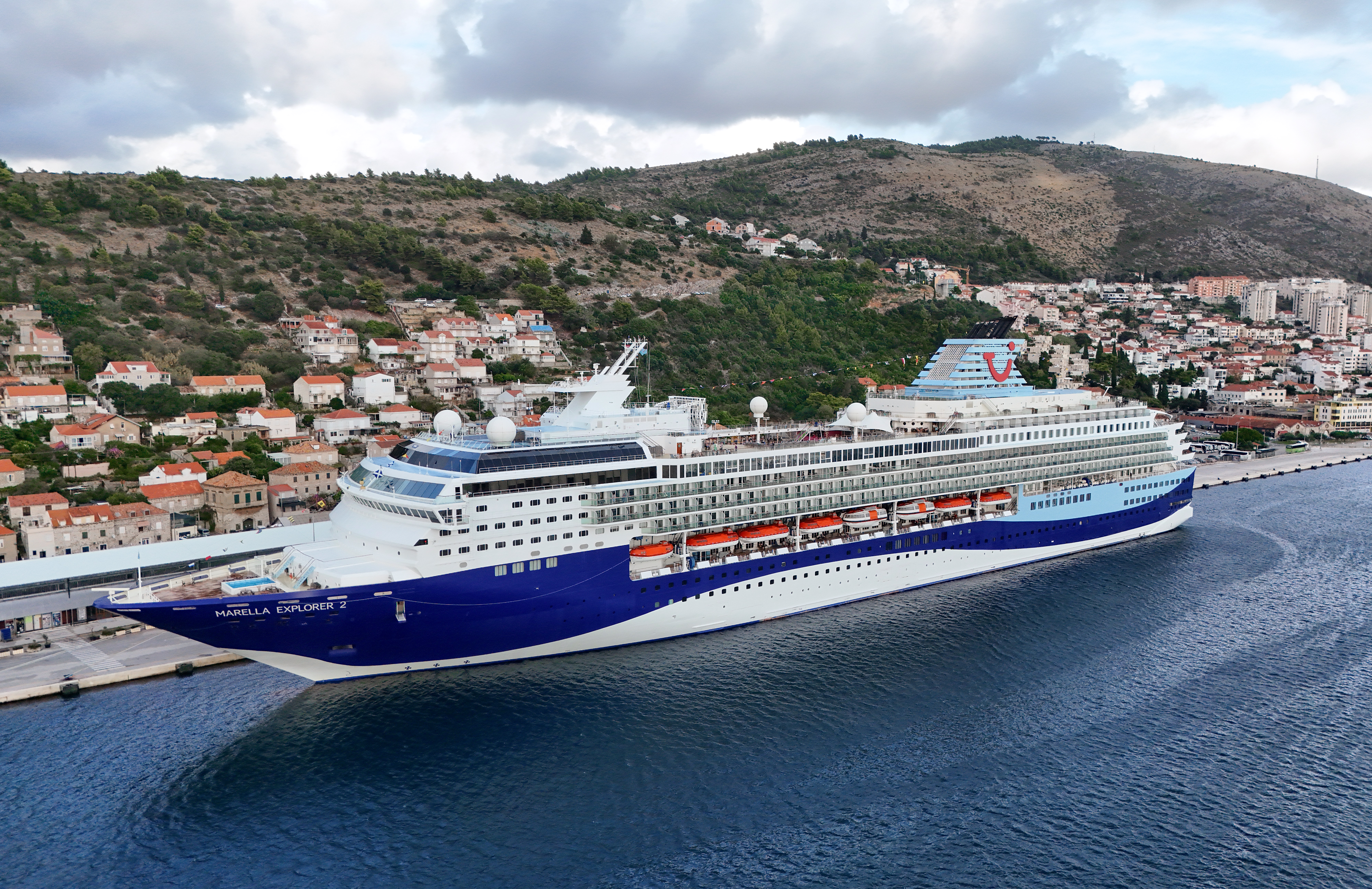
- Marella Explorer 2

Class overview
- Name: Century
- Builders: Meyer Werft
- Operators: 1997–2011: Celebrity Cruises; 2011–2023: TUI Cruises; 2023-Present: Marella Cruises
- Succeeded by: Millennium class
- Built: 1994–1997
- In service: 1995–present
- Planned: 3
- Completed: 3
- Active: 3

General characteristics
- Type: Cruise ship
- Length: 264 m (866 ft 2 in)
- Beam: 32 m (105 ft 0 in)
- Draft: 8 m (26 ft 3 in)
- Decks: 12 decks
- Installed power: 2 × MAN B&W marine diesel engines 29,300 kW (39,300 hp)
- Propulsion: Twin propellers
- Speed: 21.5 knots (39.8 km/h; 24.7 mph)
- Boats & landing craft carried: 18 lifeboats
- Capacity: 1,912 passengers
- Crew: 999 crews

The Century class is a class of three cruise ships of originally built for Celebrity Cruises. They are currently operating for Marella Cruises. The ships were built between 1994 and 1997 at Meyer Werft in Papenburg, Germany.

== Ships ==
Ship	Year Built	Gross tonnage	Flag	Notes	Image
Marella Explorer 2	1995	72,458	Malta	formerly Celebrity Century	
Marella Explorer	1996	76,998	Malta	formerly Celebrity Galaxy	
Marella Voyager	1997	77,302	Malta	formerly Celebrity Mercury	
