= Marella Discovery 2 =

Cruise ship built in 1995

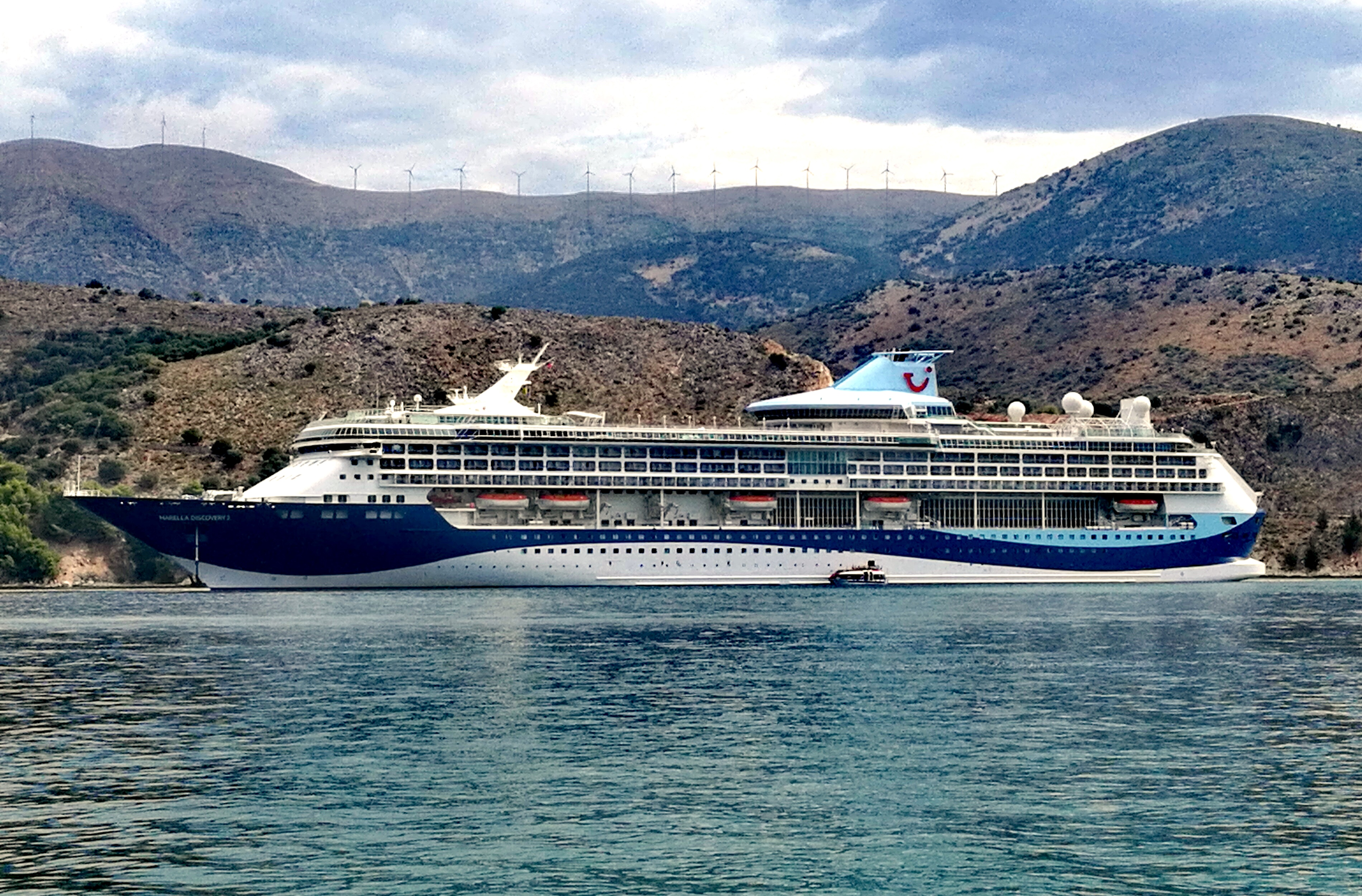
- Marella Discovery 2 anchored at Argostoli, Kefalonia

History
- Name: 1995–2017: Legend of the Seas; 2017: TUI Discovery 2; 2017–present: Marella Discovery 2
- Owner: Marella Cruises 2017 – present; Royal Caribbean Cruises 1995–2017
- Operator: Royal Caribbean International 1995–2017; Thomson Cruises 2017; Marella Cruises 2017 – present
- Port of registry: 1995–2002: Monrovia, Liberia; 2002–present: Nassau, Bahamas
- Builder: Chantiers de l'Atlantique; Saint-Nazaire, France
- Yard number: A31
- Launched: September 5, 1994
- In service: 1995
- Identification: Call sign C6SL5; IMO number: 9070620; MMSI number: 311378000; DNV ID: 18204
- Status: In service

General characteristics
- Class & type: Vision-class cruise ship
- Tonnage: 69,472 GT
- Length: 264.26 m (867 ft 0 in)
- Beam: Max: 37 m (121 ft 5 in); Waterline: 32 m (105 ft 0 in)
- Height: 50 m (164 ft 1 in) air draft
- Draft: 8.068 m (26 ft 5.6 in)
- Depth: 10.45 m (34 ft 3 in)
- Decks: 11
- Installed power: 5 × Wärtsilä Vasa 12V46B V12 engines; 11,700 kW (15,700 hp) each
- Propulsion: 2 × 5.8 m (19 ft) diameter, fixed pitch propellers
- Speed: 24 knots (44 km/h; 28 mph)
- Capacity: 1,836 passengers
- Crew: 771 crew

Marella Discovery 2, launched as Legend of the Seas, is the lead ship of the Vision class of cruise ships (originally operated by Royal Caribbean International). With a gross tonnage of 69,130 GT, the ship can carry 2,074 passengers. Its maiden voyage was May 16, 1995. The ship's facilities include a rock climbing wall, a mini-golf course, dining areas and bars, an atrium, two pools, a theatre and a fitness centre.

== Career ==
As Legend of the Seas, it was the most-traveled ship in the Royal Caribbean fleet, having been based in Asia, Australia and New Zealand, the South Pacific, Alaska, Central America, Caribbean, the Baltic, Mediterranean and the Middle East during her 19-year career at sea. Starting in the winter of 2009 she was based in Asia on a year-round basis.

After the 2011 Tōhoku earthquake, almost all of her North Asia routes were canceled.

In 2013 she returned to Europe to offer cruises in the Mediterranean Sea. During the winter period the ship was based at Fort Lauderdale for Caribbean cruises. In the summer period in 2014, she offered cruises to Northern Europe where she visited port in the Baltic Sea and Norway.

On 2 June 2016, Royal Caribbean sold Legend of the Seas to the UK based Thomson Cruises. Legend of the Seas's last scheduled cruise with Royal Caribbean ended on 26 March 2017 before the ship was transferred to Thomson. She first appeared as the TUI Discovery 2 in Malaga, Spain on 14 May 2017.

Following the announcement on 9 October 2017, that Thomson Cruises would be renamed Marella Cruises, TUI Group also announced that TUI Discovery 2 would adopt the name Marella Discovery 2 at the end of October 2017. On 28 October 2017, TUI Discovery 2 was renamed Marella Discovery 2 in a ceremony held at the port of Tenerife by members of the ship's crew chosen as 'outstanding performers' by the company, together with the Captain.

Marella Discovery 2 is the sister ship to Marella Discovery.
