= Vision of the Seas =

Cruise ship

- Vision of the Seas in Boston, Massachusetts, 2024.

History
- Name: Vision of the Seas
- Owner: Vision of the Seas
- Operator: Royal Caribbean International
- Port of registry: Monrovia, Liberia 1998–2002; Nassau, Bahamas 2002–Present
- Builder: Chantiers de l'Atlantique; Saint-Nazaire, France
- Yard number: F31
- Laid down: October 29, 1996
- Launched: September 1, 1997
- Completed: April 15, 1998
- Maiden voyage: May 2, 1998
- In service: May 2, 1998
- Identification: Call sign: C6SE8; DNV ID: 19121; IMO number: 9116876; MMSI number: 311321000
- Status: In Service

General characteristics
- Class & type: Vision-class cruise ship
- Tonnage: 78,340 GT
- Length: 279.0 m (915.4 ft)
- Beam: 35.6 m (117 ft)
- Height: 59 m (193 ft 7 in)
- Draught: 8.30 m (27.2 ft)
- Decks: 14
- Speed: 22 knots (41 km/h; 25 mph)
- Capacity: 2,050 passengers (double occupancy) 2,514 passengers (maximum)
- Crew: 765

Vision of the Seas is a Vision-class cruise ship operated by Royal Caribbean International, the last of her class. She is also the namesake of her class. Her maiden voyage began on May 2, 1998, following which she sailed for a year in Europe before being moved to other routes.

In 2013, Vision of the Seas received a dry dock refit, which was also her last refit. In May 2023, it moved to a new home port of Baltimore.

== Design ==
The cruise ship has a deadweight tonnage of 6,300 tons and a gross tonnage of 78,491. Vision of the Seas has a length of 279 metres (915 ft) and a beam of 32.2 metres (106 ft). Vision of the Seas was launched in 1997. The draft of the vessel is 7.63 metres (25.0 ft). The cruise ship has 10 passenger decks and capacity for 2,416 guests. Vision of the Seas has a crew of 765.

== History ==
In 2017, during a Caribbean cruise out of Galveston, a member of Vision of the Seas' housekeeping staff went mysteriously overboard unnoticed. No search efforts were launched and the crewmember remains missing.

In May 2018, a Vision of the Seas crew member died by suicide by jumping overboard while the ship was en route to Galveston, Texas.

In 2019, while berthed at Livorno, a crewmember of Vision of the Seas went overboard. Port divers later found the crewmember dead.

In June 2020, a Vision of the Seas crew member died in hospital shortly after being repatriated from the ship during the global COVID-19 pandemic. The death was not COVID related.

On 23 December 2023, a passenger was lost when they fell overboard while the ship was off the coast of Charleston, South Carolina. The United States Coast Guard undertook a 1,625 square mile search, but could find no trace of the passenger after eight hours.

== See also ==
- List of cruise ships
- Royal Caribbean Group
