= Marella Explorer 2 =

Century-class cruise ship

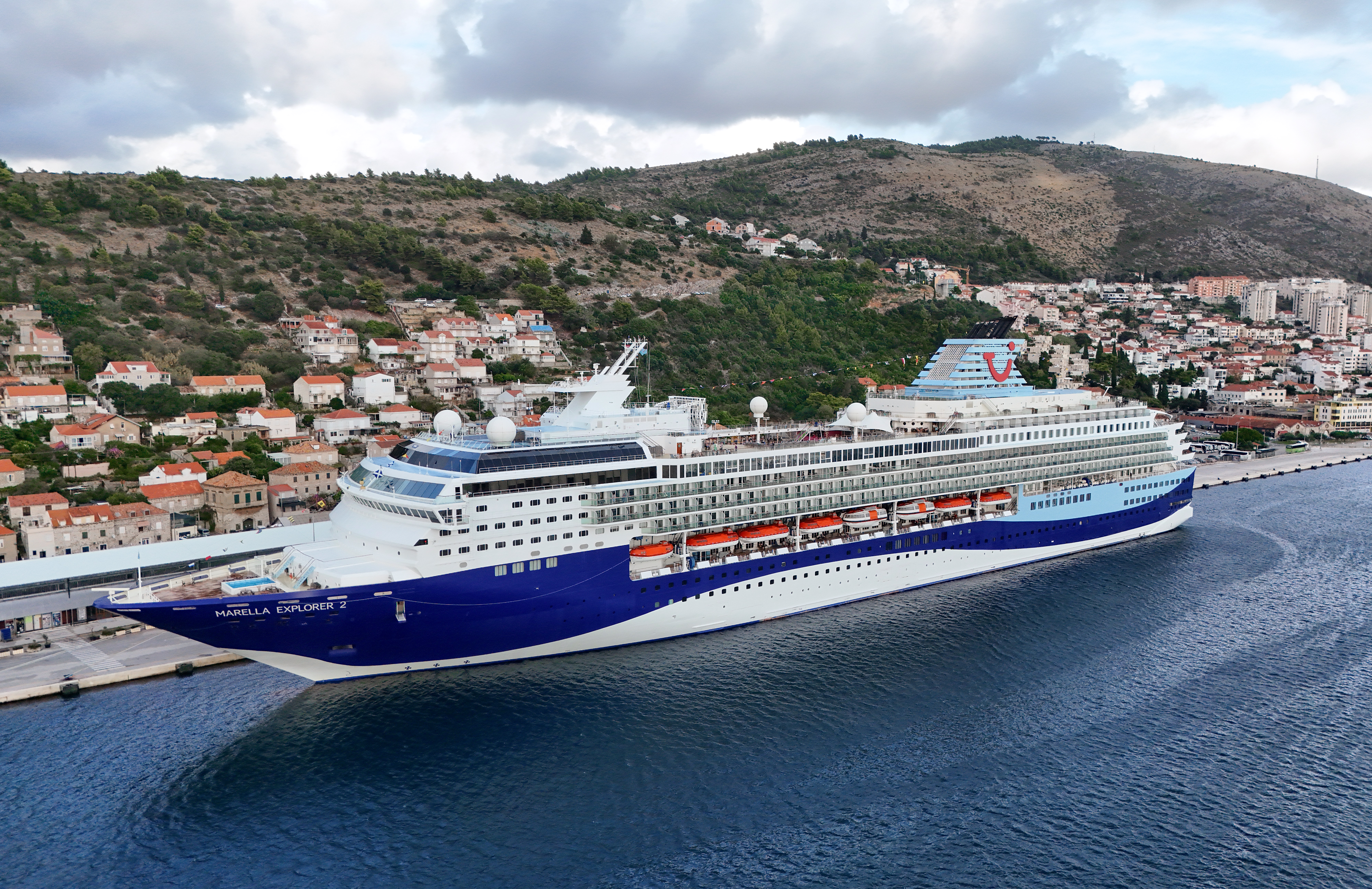
- Marella Explorer 2 in 2024

History
- Name: Century (1995–2007); Celebrity Century (2007–2015); SkySea Golden Era (2015–2019); Marella Explorer 2 (2019–present)
- Owner: Celebrity Cruises (1995–1997) Royal Caribbean Group (1997–2019) TUI Group (2019–present)
- Operator: Celebrity Cruises (1995–2015); SkySea Cruise Line (2015–2019); Marella Cruises (2019–present)
- Port of registry: 1995–2002: Monrovia, Liberia; 2002–2008: Nassau, Bahamas; 2008 onwards: Valletta, Malta
- Builder: Meyer Werft, Papenburg, Germany
- Yard number: 637
- Laid down: January 1994
- Launched: 18 May 1995
- Completed: 30 November 1995
- Maiden voyage: 20 December 1995
- In service: 1995–present
- Identification: Call sign: 9HJI9; IMO number: 9072446; MMSI number: 249054000
- Status: In service

General characteristics
- Class & type: Century-class cruise ship
- Tonnage: 71,545 GT; 39,002 NT
- Length: 248 m (813 ft 8 in)
- Beam: 32 m (105 ft 0 in)
- Draught: 7.6 m (24 ft 11 in)
- Decks: 12
- Speed: 21.5 knots (39.8 km/h; 24.7 mph)
- Capacity: 1,814 passengers
- Crew: 843

Marella Explorer 2, formerly Celebrity Century and SkySea Golden Era, was the lead ship of the Century class of cruise ships for Celebrity Cruises, and the co-flagship of the Celebrity fleet, along with Millennium-class ship Celebrity Constellation, and the newest Solstice class, Celebrity Reflection. Other ships belonging to the Century class include Marella Explorer (formerly Celebrity Galaxy) and Mein Schiff 2 (2011) (formerly Celebrity Mercury).

In March 2018, it was announced that Royal Caribbean Cruises and Ctrip were to close the SkySea Cruise Line brand and that the line's sole ship, SkySea Golden Era would join the Marella fleet in place of Mein Schiff 2 which would stay with TUI Cruises. Skysea Golden Era would take her final voyage on 29 August 2018. It was a 4-night sailing from Shanghai with a call at Fukuoka, Japan.

SkySea Golden Era underwent a major refurbishment in Cadiz, Spain, in order to become Marella Explorer 2. Its first sailing for Marella Cruises was in April 2019.

== History ==
Century was launched in 1995 and went into a five-week drydock in April 2006 for refurbishment. Designed to incorporate a variety of Celebrity's Millennium-class attributes, the revitalization of Century was the line's most extensive refurbishment to-date, and the largest cruise ship modification completed by Fincantieri's Palermo, Italy, shipyard.

In late December 2013, it was rumored that the ship would transfer to CDF Croisières de France in 2015. Celebrity Cruises continued to deny the rumors until 13 February 2014, when they formally announced her departure from the fleet in April 2015. From March 2014 through April 2015, Celebrity Century visited 77 ports in 32 countries, the most destinations of any ship in the Celebrity fleet. The line celebrated this final season with several special events, including a 14-night President's Cruise to Asia with Celebrity President and CEO Michael Bayley. On 2 September 2014, it was announced that SkySea Cruises, a joint venture between Ctrip and Royal Caribbean, would acquire the vessel and begin operations after April 2015.

=== Coronavirus pandemic ===
On 25 March 2020, four crew members tested positive of COVID-19 and were stranded in Barbados. On 30 March, the ship was sailing along the Yucatan coast with plans to dock in Progreso, Yucatan. On 3 April, a male British passenger died from the disease while his wife had also been infected. On 19 April, out of 19 Jamaican crew members on the ship, two of them tested positive.

=== Overboard incident ===
On 27 November 2025, a British passenger aboard the ship while sailing to La Gomera went missing. Other passengers indicated the male passenger was seen falling overboard the vessel.
