= Vision-class cruise ship =

Cruise ships, built 1995–1998

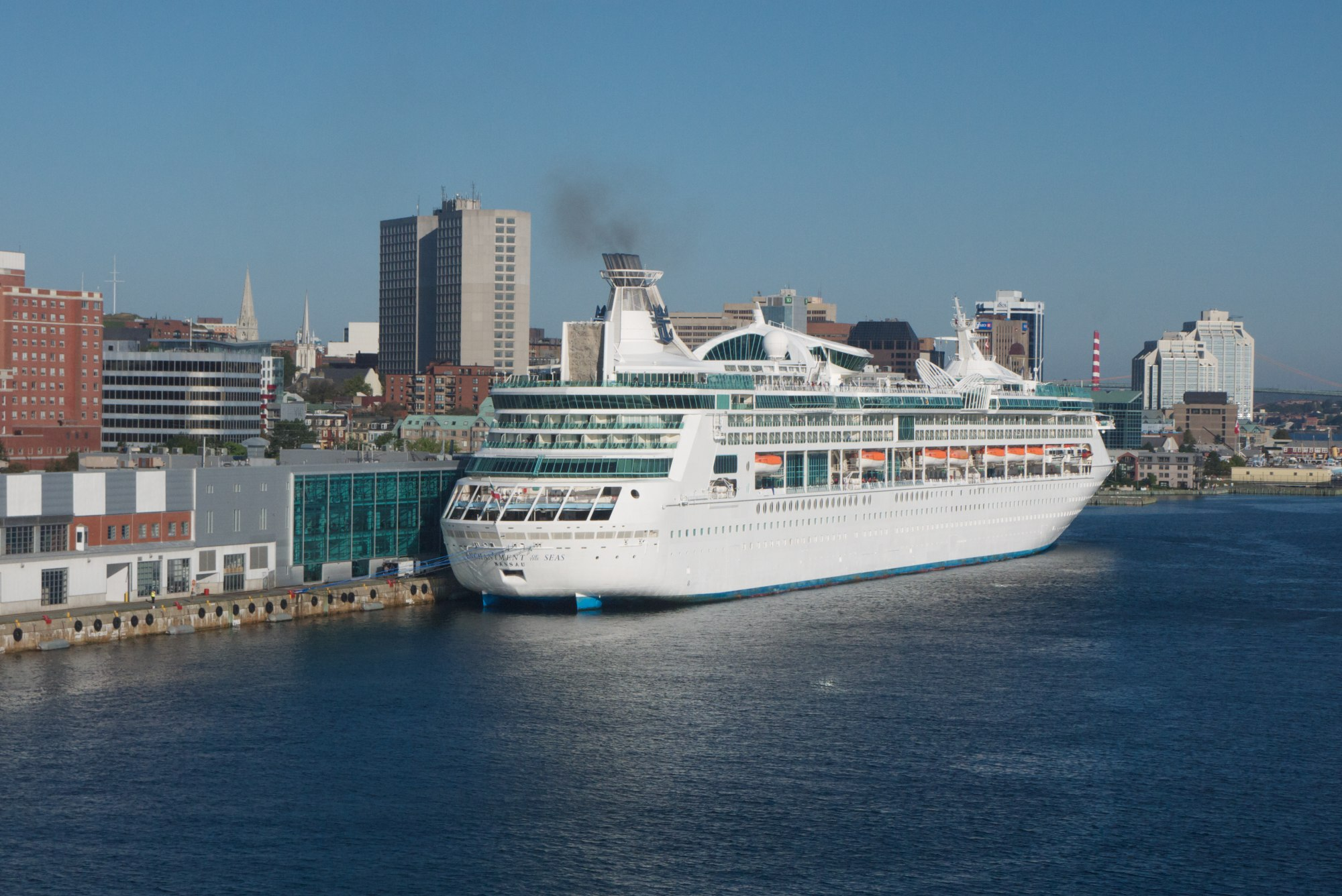
- Enchantment of the Seas docked in Halifax, Nova Scotia, Canada on September 27, 2011

Class overview
- Builders: Kvaerner Masa Yards; Chantiers de l'Atlantique
- Operators: Royal Caribbean International (1995-present); Marella Cruises (2017-present)
- Preceded by: Sovereign class
- Succeeded by: Radiance class; Voyager class
- Subclasses: 3
- Built: 1993–1998
- In service: 1995–present
- Planned: 6
- Completed: 6
- Active: 6

General characteristics
- Type: Cruise ship
- Tonnage: 70,000–80,700 GT
- Length: 867–990 ft (264–302 m)
- Beam: 106 ft (32 m)
- Decks: 11
- Speed: 22 knots (41 km/h; 25 mph)
- Capacity: 2,076–2,446 passengers
- Crew: 1,200 average

The Vision class is a group of six cruise ships built by Royal Caribbean International, and operated by themselves and Marella Cruises. Although called a class by Royal Caribbean, the Vision-class ships were built as three pairs of sister ships, each pair differing from the others in size and design. Unlike other Royal Caribbean classes, the Vision class is not named for the first ship built; Vision of the Seas was the last ship in the class to be built. Royal Caribbean had been promoting "Project Vision" for some time before ordering the first two ships in the class in 1992, but Vision of the Seas was not ordered until 1994.

Vision-class ships were designed to have more glass windows than any other ships at the time they debuted, and therefore greater views of the oceans from interior spaces. Ships in the Vision class were also the fastest built in 25 years thanks to their diesel-electric propulsion systems (the first in the Royal Caribbean fleet), which allowed the larger engines to be placed closer to the middle of the ships for better weight balance.

Two of the ships were built at Kvaerner Masa-Yards, Helsinki New Shipyard, Finland, while the others were built at Chantiers de l'Atlantique, St. Nazaire, France.

== Ships ==
Ship	Year built	Entered service with Two Ship Operations	Shipyard	Gross tonnage	Ship Christening	Flag	Notes	Image
Royal Caribbean International
Built in 1996 and 1997 by Kvaerner Masa-Yards, approximately 74,000 gross tons when built. Enchantment was lengthened by 73 feet in 2005, making it over 80,000 gross tons.
Grandeur of the Seas	1996	December 14, 1996	Kværner Masa-Yards Hietalahti shipyard, Helsinki, Finland	73,817	Aviva Ofer	Bahamas	In October 2019 it was announced that Grandeur of the Seas will transfer to Pullmantur Cruises in 2021, however due to Pullmantur's bankruptcy, Grandeur will remain with Royal Caribbean.	
Enchantment of the Seas	1997	July 13, 1997	Kværner Masa-Yards Hietalahti shipyard, Helsinki, Finland	82,910	Colleen Fain	Bahamas	In 2005, a 74-foot (23 m) midsection was added to Enchantment of the Seas, allowing for the addition of a pool, suspension bridges, specialty restaurants, additional staterooms, and expanded areas for guest comfort.; In 2009 collided with Carnival Legend, which was already docked, in Cozumel, Mexico	
Built in 1997 and in 1998 by Chantiers l'Atlantique, approximately 78,000 gross tons.
Rhapsody of the Seas	1997	May 19, 1997	Chantiers de l'Atlantique, Saint-Nazaire, France	78,491	Bodil Wilhelmsen	Bahamas	Received upgrades in 2012 to add an outdoor movie screen, new dining venues, digital signage, Wi-Fi internet access, concierge and diamond lounges, and a nursery.	
Vision of the Seas	1998	May 2, 1998	Chantiers de l'Atlantique, Saint-Nazaire, France	78,340	Helen M. Stephan	Bahamas	Received upgrades in 2013 to add an outdoor movie screen, new dining venues, digital signage, Wi-Fi internet access, concierge and diamond lounges, and a nursery.	
Marella Cruises (Formerly Thomson Cruises)
Built in 1995 and in 1996 by Chantiers l'Atlantique, approximately 70,000 gross tons, The only two ships in the Vision class are sold to transferred by Thomson Cruises (but now, Marella Cruises). Legend and Splendour of the Seas are became as TUI Discovery and TUI Discovery 2, and they currently renamed as "Marella Discovery" and "Marella Discovery 2", and to feature miniature golf courses.
Marella Discovery (Formally Splendour of the Seas)	1996	March 31, 1996	Chantiers de l'Atlantique, Saint-Nazaire, France	69,130	Lise Wilhelmsen	Bahamas	Sold to Thomson Cruises and renamed TUI Discovery in 2016, then Marella Discovery in 2017.	
Marella Discovery 2 (Formally Legend of the Seas)	1995	May 16, 1995	Chantiers de l'Atlantique, Saint-Nazaire, France	69,130	Cindy Pritzker	Bahamas	Retrofitted in 2013. Sold to Thomson Cruises and renamed in 2017, first as TUI Discovery 2, then as Marella Discovery 2, as part of Tui's rebranding of their cruise businesses.	
