= Marella Discovery =

Cruise ship

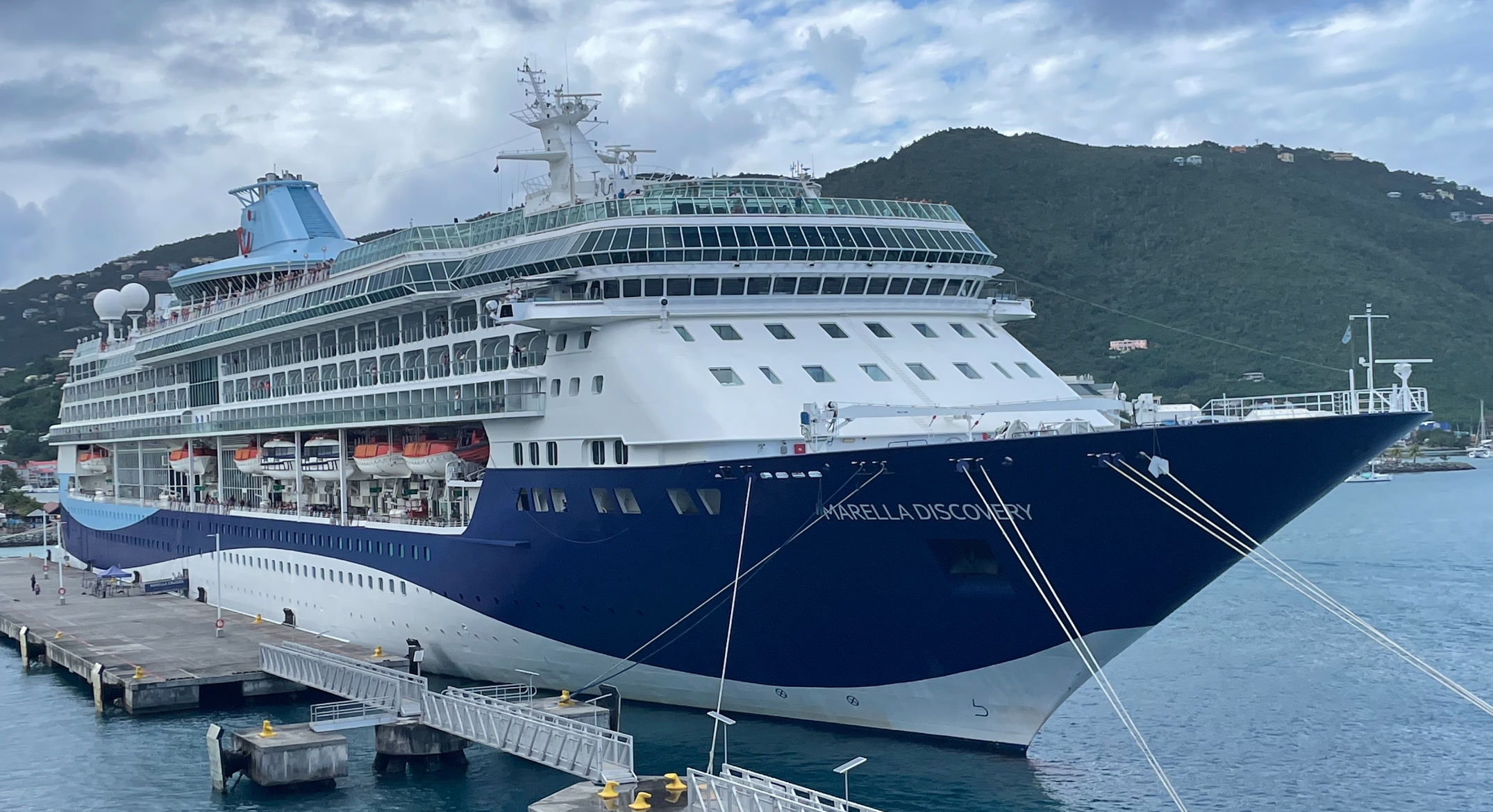
- Marella Discovery docked at Road Town, Tortola's port in 2024.

History
- Name: 1995–2016: Splendour of the Seas; 2016-2017: TUI Discovery; 2017-present: Marella Discovery
- Owner: 1996–2016 Royal Caribbean Cruises Ltd.; 2016–present: TUI AG
- Operator: 1995–2016 Royal Caribbean International; 2016–2017: Thomson Cruises; 2017–present: Marella Cruises
- Port of registry: Norway, Oslo (1996–2005); Bahamas, Nassau (2005–2016); Malta, Valletta (2016 onwards)
- Route: Marmaris, Turkey Orlando, Florida And Bridgetown, Barbados
- Builder: Chantiers de l'Atlantique; Saint-Nazaire, France
- Yard number: B31
- Launched: 17 June 1995
- Christened: March 1996
- Maiden voyage: 31 March 1996
- In service: 31 March 1996 (as Splendour of the Seas) June 11, 2016 (as TUI Discovery)
- Identification: Call sign 9HA4324; IMO number: 9070632; MMSI number: 249639000; DNV ID: 18426
- Status: In service

General characteristics
- Class & type: Vision-class cruise ship
- Tonnage: 69,130 GT
- Displacement: 35,396 tonnes (34,837 long tons; 39,017 short tons)
- Length: 264 metres (866 ft) length overall
- Beam: 32 metres (105 ft)
- Height: 50 metres (160 ft) air draft
- Draft: 25.9 feet (7.9 m)
- Decks: 11
- Installed power: 5 × Wärtsilä Vasa 12V46B V12 engines; 11,700 kilowatts (15,700 hp) each
- Propulsion: 2 5.8-metre (19 ft) diameter, fixed pitch propellers
- Speed: 24 knots (44 km/h; 28 mph)
- Capacity: 1.830 passengers
- Crew: 720-750 crew
- Notes: Smallest Vision-class cruise ship as in length and tonnage

Marella Discovery (formerly Splendour of the Seas and TUI Discovery) is a former Royal Caribbean International Vision-class cruise ship now sailing for Marella Cruises. The second in the line of the Vision-class ships, she features a seven-story lobby, rock-climbing wall, and a 9-hole miniature golf course.

Following the announcement on 9 October 2017 that Thomson Cruises would be renamed Marella Cruises, TUI Group also announced that TUI Discovery would adopt the name Marella Discovery at the end of October 2017, and also that she would become the first ship in the Thomson fleet to be based in Asia, home porting Malaysia in Autumn 2018, following the end of her UK debut season.

== History ==
Marella Discovery was Royal Caribbean International's Splendour of the Seas by Chantiers de l'Atlantique at their shipyard in Saint-Nazaire, France. The ship was assigned the yard number "B31", and was launched on 17 June 1995 by Lisa Wilhelmsen. The ship is registered to the port of Nassau, in the Bahamas. Maiden voyage for Splendour of the Seas commenced on 31 March 1996.

On 31 October 2011, Royal Caribbean and Spanish shipyard Navantia signed a contract for Splendour of the Seas to receive structural modifications, maintenance to the propellers, propeller shafts and rudder, and interior upgrades, including new dining and public areas, 124 new balconies, and improvements to staterooms. The work was expected to take about five weeks to complete.

Until April 2016, Splendour of the Seas was based in Brazil during the southern hemisphere summer, doing a series of itineraries from three to twelve nights throughout South America, and is based out of Venice, Italy during the northern hemisphere summer, sailing seven night cruises to the Eastern Mediterranean.

In March 2015, Royal Caribbean sold Splendour of the Seas to TUI Cruises who was then sub-chartered to Thomson Cruises, with the final sailing for Royal Caribbean departing on 4 April 2016. The ship was renamed TUI Discovery and was based in Palma, Mallorca and Bridgetown, Barbados starting in June 2016 after refurbishment. She was originally going to be renamed Thomson Discovery, but the name was changed to TUI Discovery as part of their rebranding.

On 22 October 2015 whilst sailing on a cruise in the Mediterranean, Splendour of the Seas suffered an engine-room fire, which was extinguished after 2 hours by the crew. There were no injuries reported by Royal Caribbean and the ship continued its journey to the port of Venice.

Splendour of the Seas spent her last season with Royal Caribbean International by sailing from Dubai on 7-8 night cruises, visiting destinations such as Muscat, Oman and Abu Dhabi throughout November 2015 - March 2016.

== Design ==
The gross tonnage of Marella Discovery is 69,130, and she has a displacement of 35,396 tonnes (34,837 long tons; 39,017 short tons). The cruise ship is 264 metres (866 ft) in length overall, with a beam of 32 metres (105 ft), a draft of 7.9 metres (26 ft) in summer conditions, and an air draft of 50 metres (160 ft). The propulsion system consists of five Wärtsilä Vasa 12V46B engines, which supply 11,700 kilowatts (15,700 hp) each to the ship's two, 5.8-metre (19 ft) diameter, fixed pitch propellers. Maximum speed is 24 knots (44 km/h; 28 mph), with the ship taking 1,892 metres (6,207 ft) and 6 minutes, 45 seconds to come to a full stop. Main propulsion is supplemented by two 1,500-kilowatt (2,000 hp) bow thrusters and a 1,728-kilowatt (2,317 hp) stern thruster. Two 10.8-square-metre (116 sq ft), 6.1-metre (20 ft), the ship is also equipped with stabilizers.

== Facilities and layout ==
The ship has eleven passenger accessible decks, with passenger accommodation located on decks 2 to 3 and 6 to 8. Up to 2,074 passengers can be carried, in 902 cabins. Most of the outdoor public facilities are on decks 9 and 10. Indoor passenger facilities include a theatre, casino, and a main dining room.

The standard crew complement is 720, with accommodation for another 30 if required; most crew accommodation is located near the bottom of the ship, on deck 0 and 1. The bridge is located forward on deck 8. Onboard equipment can generate 1,100,000 litres (240,000 imp gal; 290,000 US gal) of fresh water every day, 600,000 litres (130,000 imp gal; 160,000 US gal) of which will be used aboard during the same period.

== Gallery ==
Marella Discovery as Splendour of the Seas at Ilhabela, Brazil in 2008

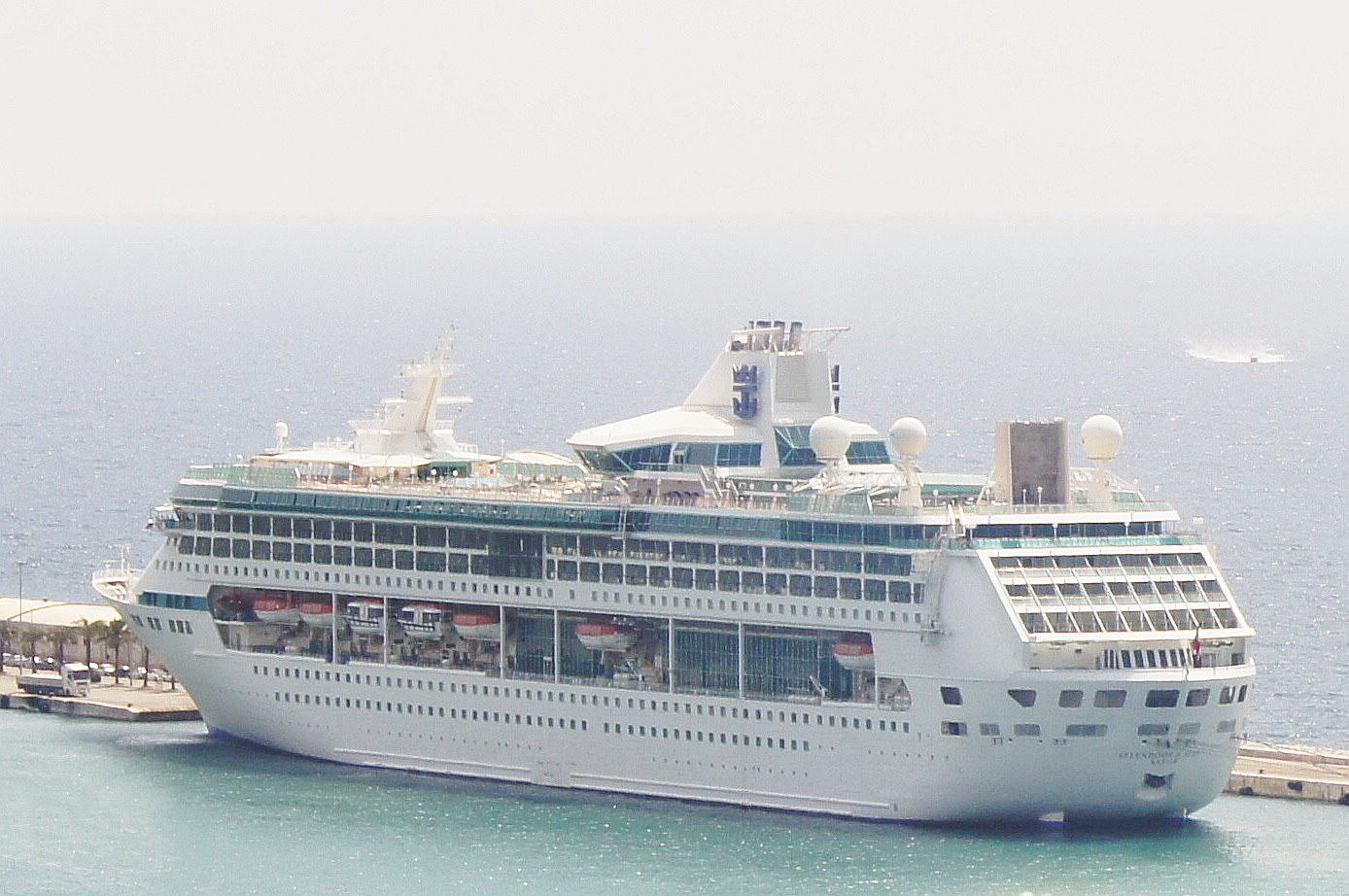
Marella Discovery as Splendour of the Seas at Split, Croatia on 14 July 2011

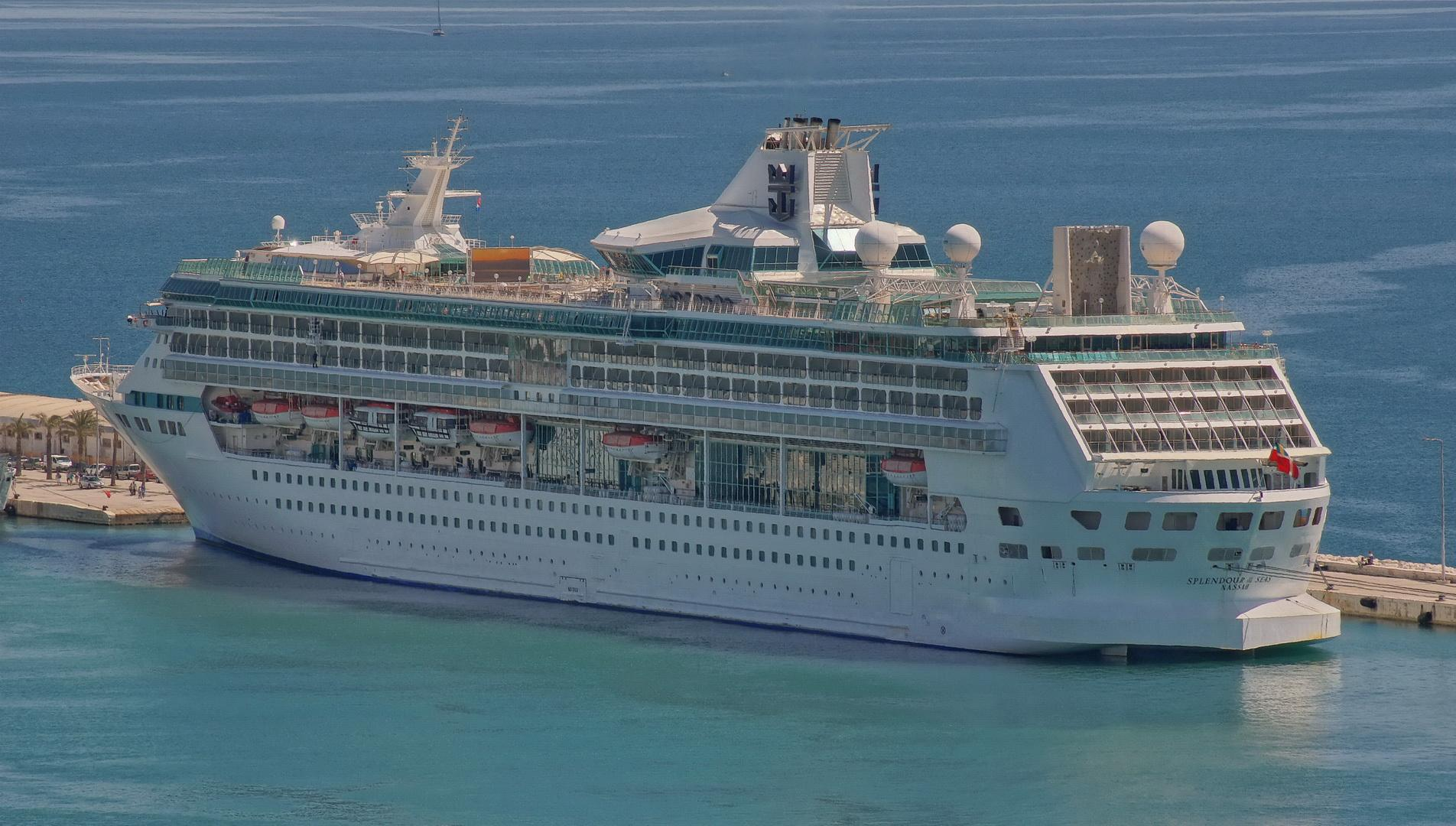
Marella Discovery as Splendour of the Seas in Split, Croatia on 27 April 2012, after structural modifications

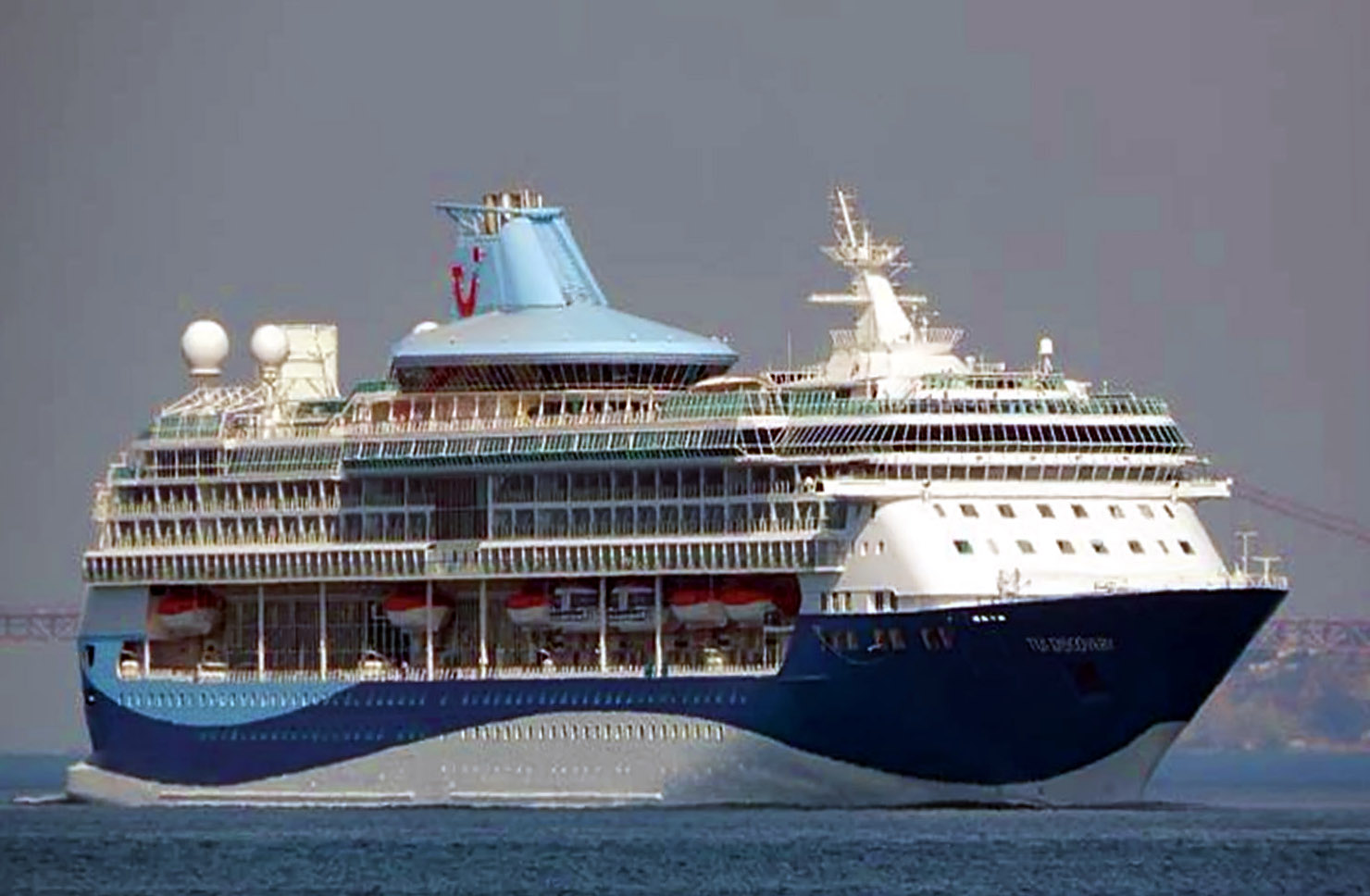
TUI Discovery underway
