= Marella Cruises =

British cruise line

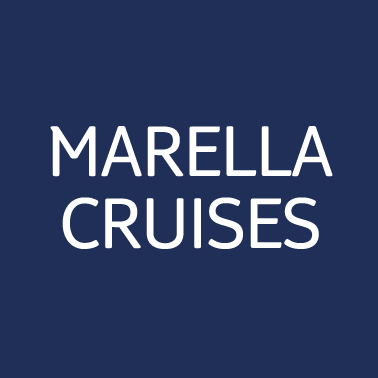
- Formerly: Thomson Cruises
- Type: Private limited company
- Industry: Transport
- Founded: 1973
- Headquarters: United Kingdom
- Key people: Christopher Hackney (managing director)
- Products: Cruises
- Parent: TUI Group
- Website: tui.co.uk/cruise.html

Marella Cruises (formerly Thomson Cruises) is a British cruise line operated by TUI UK (formerly Thomson), offering cruise holidays around Europe and the Caribbean.

== History ==
Thomson had initially entered the cruise market in 1973, but due to rising fuel costs the venture was terminated in 1976. In 1995, Thomson restarted their cruise line after their competitor Airtours had made a successful entry in the cruise business under their Sun Cruises brand.

On 9 October 2017, TUI Group announced that Thomson Cruises would be rebranded in late October 2017 as Marella Cruises, with all of the existing Thomson fleet adopting the name change either from Thomson or TUI to Marella (except Thomson Spirit which was renamed Spirit and Thomson Majesty which will be transferred to Celestyal Cruises). The line also announced that it would base TUI Discovery in Asia for the Winter season of 2018, with the ship being based out of Malaysia, the first in the line's history.

The name "Marella" means "shining sea" in Celtic, with the name being adopted to keep the line distinct from TUI Cruises, TUI's joint venture with Royal Caribbean.

In 2012, Marella Cruises held approximately a 1% market share of the worldwide cruise industry.

In May 2021, with the cruise sector planning for revival following the COVID-19 pandemic, TUI were reported to be planning to merge Marella Cruises with their TUI Cruises joint venture with Royal Caribbean, as they had already done with Hapag-Lloyd Cruises.

== Fleet ==
MS Island Escape was added to the Thomson fleet in April 2009, as a result of parent company TUI's acquisition of Royal Caribbean Cruises Ltd.'s share in Island Cruises that took place in 2008. As of March 2013, Thomson operates the Island Escape under its all-inclusive Island Cruises brand.

In March 2015, Royal Caribbean International announced that they had agreed to sell Splendour of the Seas to TUI Cruises in the second quarter of 2016, and that TUI would lease the ship to Thomson Cruises to replace the Island Escape.

In May 2015, TUI Group announced that as part of their modernization strategy, TUI Cruises' Mein Schiff 1 and Mein Schiff 2 would be transferred to Thomson Cruises over the next few years.

In March 2018, it was announced that Royal Caribbean Cruises and Ctrip were to close the SkySea Cruise Line brand and that the line's sole ship SkySea Golden Era would join the Marella fleet in place of Mein Schiff 2 which would stay with TUI Cruises. The former Mein Schiff 2 was renamed Mein Schiff Herz and joined the Marella fleet in 2023 as Marella Voyager.

In April 2020 due to the ongoing COVID-19 pandemic, it was announced that Marella Celebration would be immediately retired from the fleet. The same was announced for Marella Dream in October 2020. Both ships were scrapped in Aliaga, Turkey, in 2022.

In March 2025, Fincantieri agreed with TUI AG to build two new cruise ships for Marella Cruises in Italy, for delivery in 2030 and 2032. In September 2025, however, it was announced that those ships would not be built. Instead, TUI Cruises would receive two ships, larger than those originally planned for Marella.

=== Current fleet ===
Ship	Built	Builder	Entered service with Thomson/Marella Cruises	Gross tonnage	Flag	Notes	Image
Marella Discovery	1996	Chantiers de l'Atlantique	2016	69,130 tons	Malta	Previously Splendour of the Seas, TUI Discovery. Sub-chartered from TUI Cruises. Renamed Marella Discovery in October 2017.	
Marella Discovery 2	1995	Chantiers de l'Atlantique	2017	69,130 tons	Bahamas	Previously Legend of the Seas, TUI Discovery 2. Renamed Marella Discovery 2 in October 2017.	
Marella Explorer	1996	Meyer Werft	2018	76,522 tons	Malta	Previously Celebrity Galaxy, Mein Schiff 1, sold to Marella in 2018. Originally planned to be named Mein Schiff.	
Marella Explorer 2	1995	Meyer Werft	2019	71,545 tons	Malta	Previously Celebrity Century, SkySea Golden Era, sold to Marella in 2019.	
Marella Voyager	1997	Meyer Werft	2023	77,303 tons	Malta	Commenced service as Mercury/Celebrity Mercury. Originally planned to join the fleet in 1997 with the name Mein Schiff 2, later replaced by the Mein Schiff Herz/Marella Voyager. Replacement for the Marella Dream.	

=== Former fleet ===
Ship	Built	Builder	In service with Marella	Gross tonnage	Notes	Image
SS Ithaca	1956	Deutsche Werft	1973– 1976	8,977 tons	scrapped 2003	
SS Calypso	1955	Harland & Wolff	1975–1976	20,204 tons	originally Southern Cross, scrapped 2004	
SS Island Breeze	1962	John Brown & Co.	1997–2000	26,632 tons	scrapped 2003	
MS Sapphire	1967	Cantieri Navale Felszegi	1996–2002	12,263 tons	scrapped 2012	
SS The Topaz	1956	Fairfield Shipbuilding and Engineering	1997–2003	25,516 tons	scrapped 2008	
SS The Emerald	1958	Newport News Shipbuilding and Drydock	1997–2008	26,431 tons	scrapped 2012	
Marella Spirit	1983	Chantiers de l'Atlantique	2003–2018	33,930 tons	scrapped 2018	
Marella Celebration	1984	Chantiers de l'Atlantique	2005–2020	33,960 tons	scrapped 2022	
Thomson Destiny	1982	Wärtsilä Hietalahti shipyard	2005–2012	37,584 tons	scrapped 2025	
The Calypso	1967	Fincantieri	2006–2009	11,162 tons	scrapped 2013	
Island Escape	1982	Dubigeon-Normandie S.A	2009–2015	40,132 tons	scrapped 2018	
Marella Dream	1986	Meyer Werft	2010-2020	54,763 tons	scrapped 2022	
Thomson Majesty	1992	Kvaerner Masa-Yards	2012-2015	40,876 tons	Currently operating for Mano Maritime.	

== Accidents and incidents ==
On 9 February 2013, five crewmen of MS Thomson Majesty were killed in Santa Cruz de La Palma whilst checking a lifeboat. The lifeboat ropes snapped and it plunged 65 ft from the upper deck into the sea. It overturned as it hit the water, trapping them underneath. Three crewmen were taken to hospital, but five others - three Indonesians, one Filipino and one Ghanaian - drowned as rescue attempts were made.
