= TUI Cruises =

Cruise line based in Germany

- Type: Joint venture
- Industry: Transportation
- Founded: 2007; 19 years ago
- Headquarters: Hamburg, Germany
- Key people: Wybcke Meier
- Products: Cruise ship vacations
- Owner: Royal Caribbean (50%); TUI AG (50%)
- Website: www.tuicruises.com

TUI Cruises is a cruise line based in Germany. It was formed in 2007 as a joint venture between the German tourism company TUI AG and the American cruise line operator Royal Caribbean Group, each of which owns a 50% stake in the company.

== History ==
The company started operations in 2009 and competes with AIDA Cruises for the German market. It targets German-speaking customers who opt for a premium cruise experience. The onboard product, including food, entertainment and amenities, is tailored for German tastes and German is the main language used onboard its ships.

Due to lack of new-building capacity, TUI Cruises started by acquiring the cruise ship Celebrity Galaxy, which was built by Meyer Werft and was owned by another RCCL subsidiary, Celebrity Cruises. She left the Celebrity fleet on 16 March 2009. After acquiring Celebrity Galaxy, the ship headed to Lloyd Werft shipyards in Bremerhaven, Germany. She arrived on 27 March 2009, and received a €50 million, 38-day conversion to upgrade her facilities to suit a German-speaking market. After the conversion, she was re-christened on 15 May 2009 in Hamburg, Germany bearing her new name, Mein Schiff (My Ship). TUI planned to build two 2,500-passenger, 100,000-GT cruise ships in 2011 and 2012.

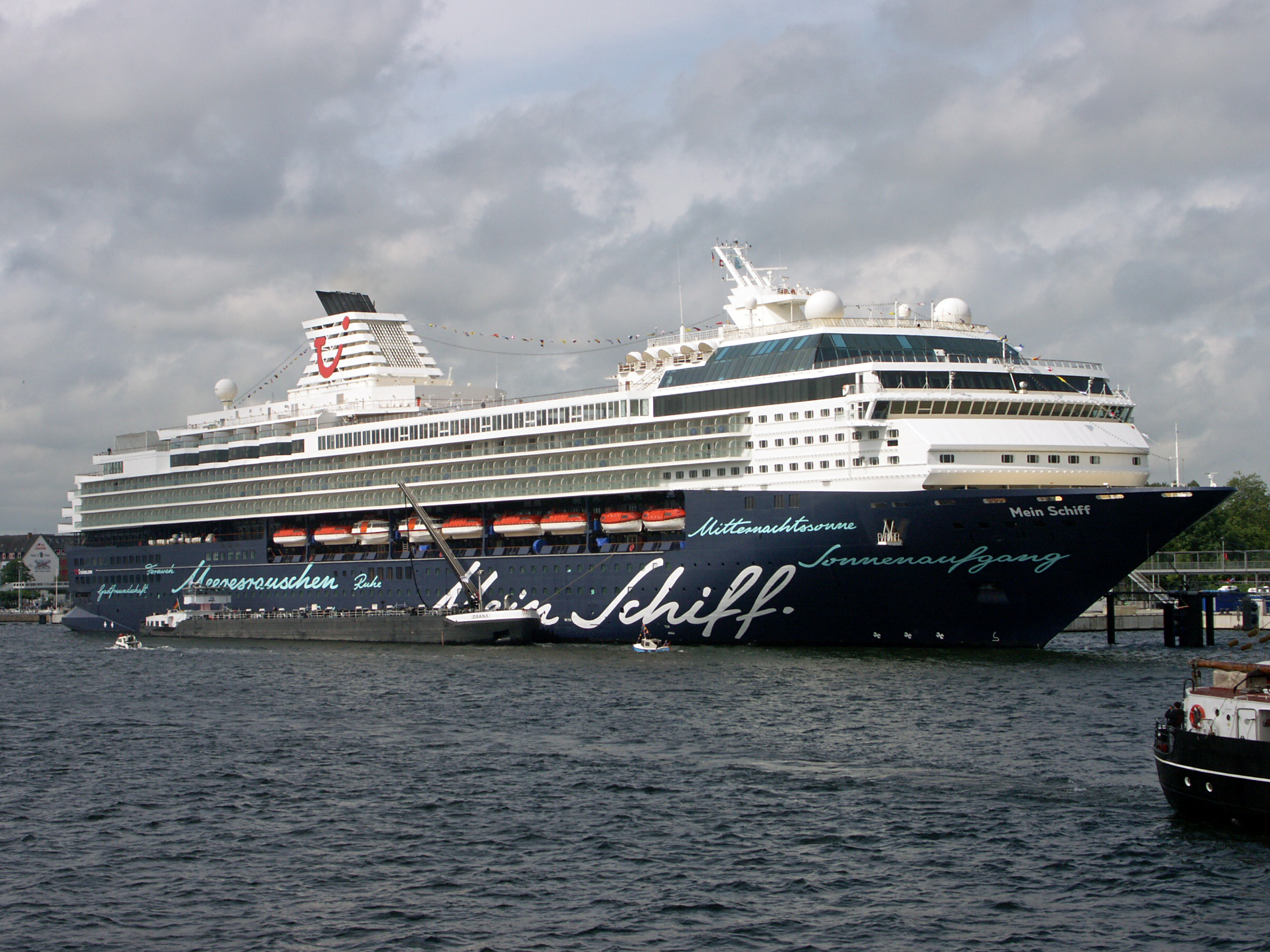
TUI cruises first ship Mein Schiff

On May 27, 2010, it was announced that another Century-class ship, Celebrity Mercury, would become the latest addition to TUI's fleet, renamed Mein Schiff 2. Due to this Mein Schiff was immediately renamed Mein Schiff 1. Mein Schiff 2 entered service with TUI in February 2011 after its extensive refurbishment, with the addition of more verandas, an expanded fitness area and design elements which are also found on Mein Schiff 1.

=== Newbuilds ===
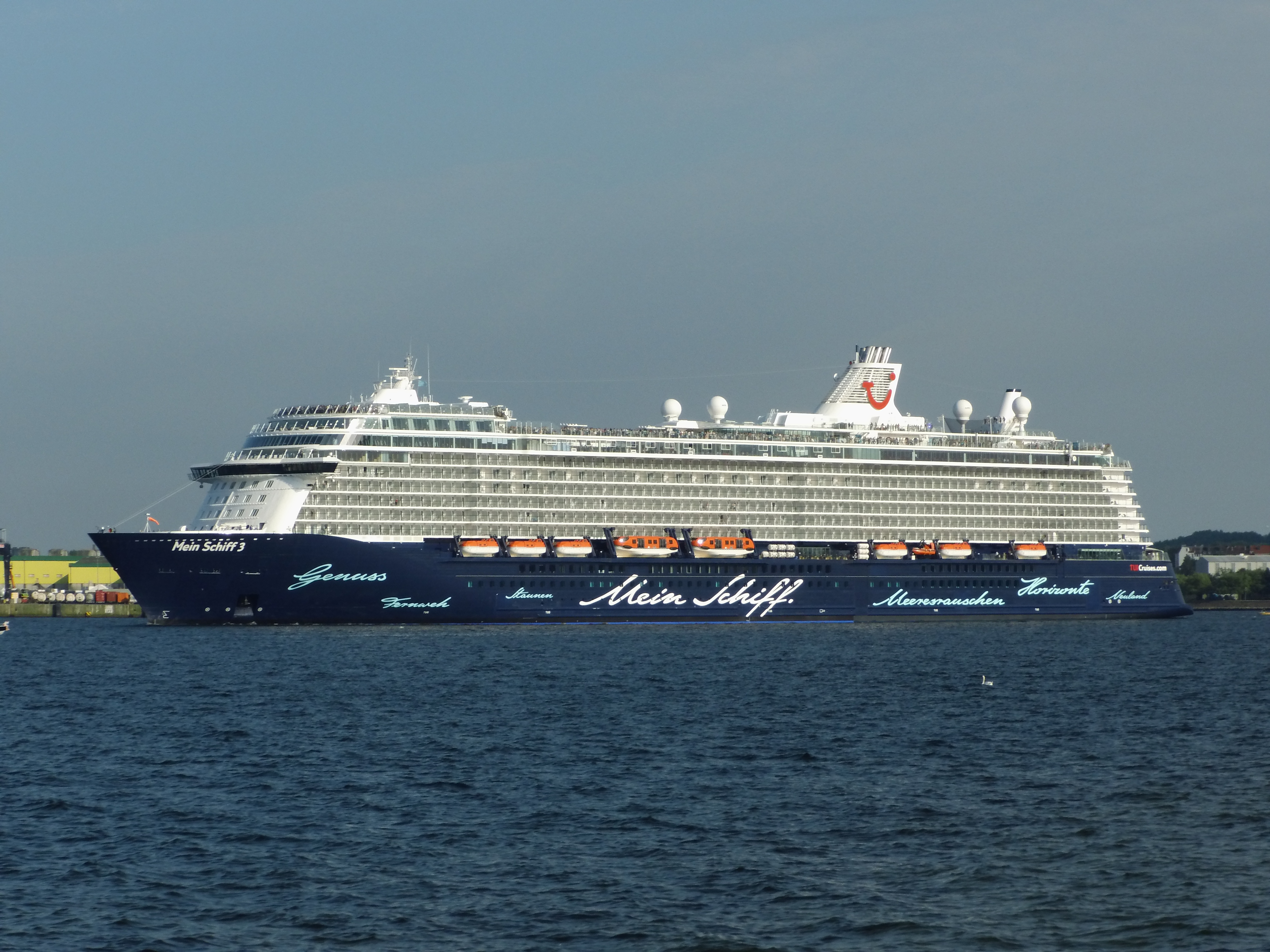
TUI Cruises first new build Mein Schiff 3

TUI and STX Finland announced a contract on 27 September 2011 to build a 97,000-GT vessel named Mein Schiff 3, first of the Blue Motion class, which was delivered in 2014. The vessel is approximately 295 metres (968 ft) long and approximately 36 metres (118 ft) wide. The ship has 1,250 staterooms, most of which have balconies, with a capacity of 2,500 passengers and a crew of 1,000. The ship includes several restaurants, a theatre, spa and nightclub. The contract included an option to build a second ship, dependent on the approval of TUI Cruises shareholders. It was announced on November 5, 2012, that TUI had taken up the second option for the sister ship to the Mein Schiff 3, to be named Mein Schiff 4. On April 22, 2014, Mein Schiff 3 entered service. In March 2015, Royal Caribbean International announced that they had agreed to sell Splendour of the Seas to TUI Cruises in the second quarter of 2016, and that TUI would lease the ship to Thomson Cruises to replace the Island Escape. In May 2015, TUI Group announced that as part of their modernization strategy, Mein Schiff 1 and Mein Schiff 2 would be transferred to Thomson Cruises over the next few years, as a result, 2 replacement ships neue Mein Schiff 1 and neue Mein Schiff 2 were ordered. On January 15, Mein Schiff 5 was launched. On April 28, Mein Schiff 6's keel was laid down.

The new Mein Schiff 1 debuted in 2018, followed by the Mein Schiff 2 in 2019. These were both enlarged version of the previous ships, and included modification in the layout of the open decks, with an enclosed sport court, expanded forward suite area, an infilled aft deck, and a new elevated jogging track.

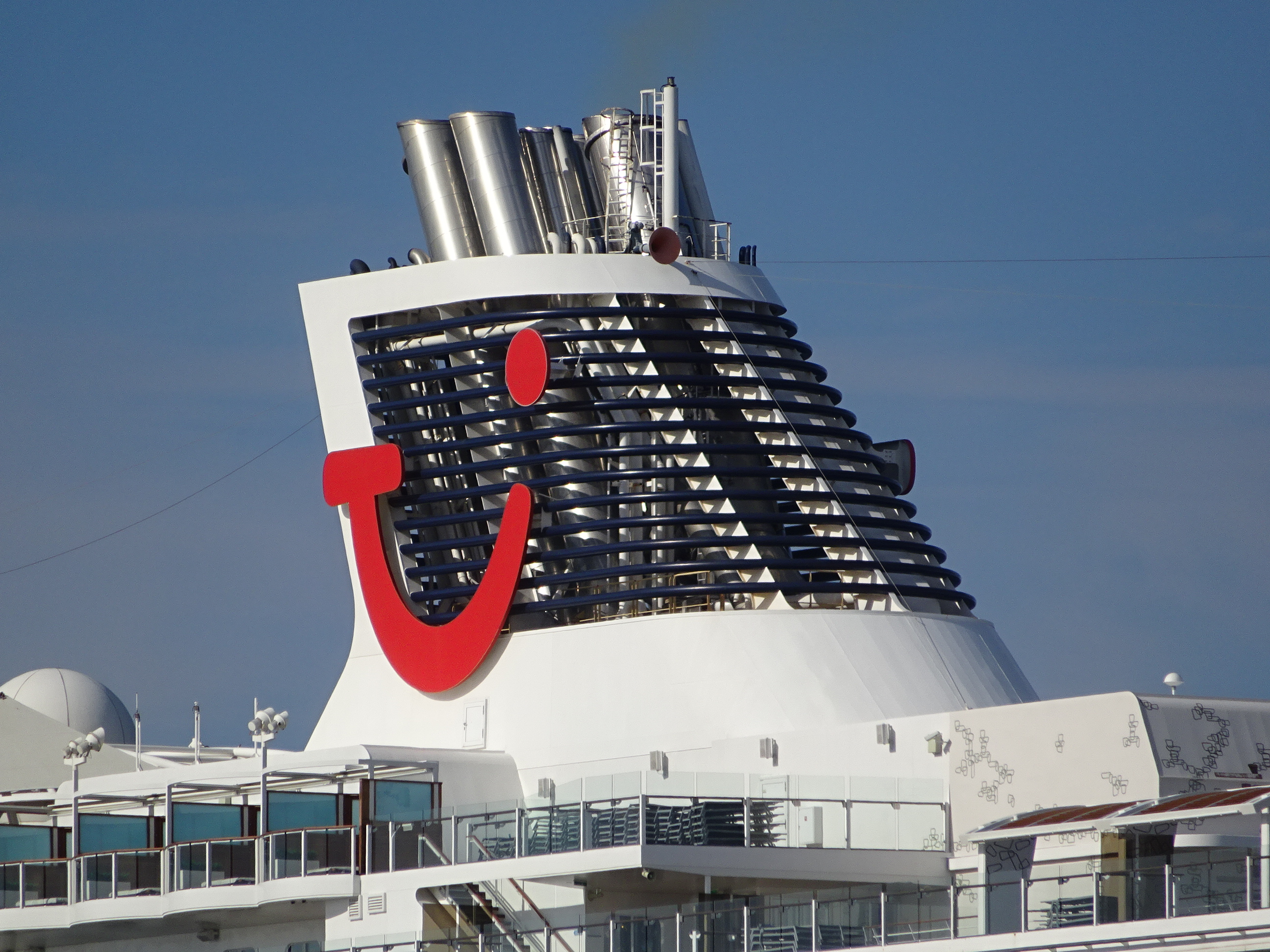
Mein Schiff funnel with TUI Logo

In July 2018, TUI Cruises announces th order of two new 160,000 ton LNG InTUItion class ships at Fincanteri.

In February 2020 TUI announced the purchase of Hapag-Lloyd Kreuzfahrten. The take over was completed in July 2020.

The Mein Schiff Herz left the fleet in April 2023.

In 2023 it was announced the new InTUItion class would introduce a new naming convention, with the first ship named Mein Schiff Relax. The ship was floated out in November 2023 at Fincantieri's Monfalcone shipyard in Italy.

The final ship of the Blue Motion Class, Mein Schiff 7 debuted in 2024, and will be one of the first methanol ready ships.

On February 7, 2025, the Mein Schiff Relax was delivered to TUI Cruises. The first new prototype design for the line in over 11 years, it is also the first LNG powered and largest ship in the fleet. Her sister ship Mein Schiff Flow was delivered in June 2026.

== Fleet ==
=== Current fleet ===
Ship	Built	Builder	in service with TUI	Gross tonnage	Flag	Notes	Image
Blu Motion Class
Mein Schiff 3	2014	STX Finland	2014	99,526	Malta	First new build for TUI Cruises	
Mein Schiff 4	2015	STX Finland/Meyer Turku	2015	99,526	Malta		
Mein Schiff 5	2016	Meyer Turku	2016	98,785	Malta	Modified from previous ships in class by removing the glass roof of the enclosed pool.	
Mein Schiff 6	2017	Meyer Turku	2017	98,811	Malta		
Blu Motion Class (enlarged)
Mein Schiff 1	2018	Meyer Turku	2018	111,500	Malta	Stretched version previous ships.	
Mein Schiff 2	2019	Meyer Turku	2019	111,500	Malta	Sister to new Mein Schiff 1	
Mein Schiff 7	2024	Meyer Turku	2024	112,982	Malta	Sister ship to Mein Schiff 1 and 2 Methanol-Ready propulsion	
Intuition Class
Mein Schiff Relax	2025	Fincantieri	2025	160,000	Malta	First LNG-fuelled ship and the largest ship for the company	
Mein Schiff Flow	2026	Fincantieri	2026	~ 160,000	Malta	inTUItion-class; Second LNG-fuelled ship and sister ship to Mein Schiff Relax	

=== Future fleet ===
Ship	Maiden Voyage	Builder	Gross Tonnage	Planned Flag	Notes
(Unnamed Intuition Class)	2031	Fincantieri	160,000-gt	Malta	Building slot originally for sister brand Marella Cruises
(Unnamed Intuition Class)	2032	Fincantieri	160,000-gt	Malta	Building slot originally for sister brand Marella Cruises

=== Former fleet ===
Ship	Built	Builder	in service with TUI	Gross tonnage	Flag	Notes	Image
Mein Schiff 1	1996	Meyer Werft	2009–2010; 2010–2018	76,522	Malta	Previously Celebrity Galaxy, transferred out of the fleet in 2018. Now sails as Marella Explorer.	
Mein Schiff Herz	1997	Meyer Werft	2011–2021	77,302	Malta	Previously Celebrity Mercury, Mein Schiff 2, Mein Schiff Herz transferred out of fleet in 2022. Will sail as Marella Voyager.	
