= Marella Explorer =

Century-class cruise ship built in 1996

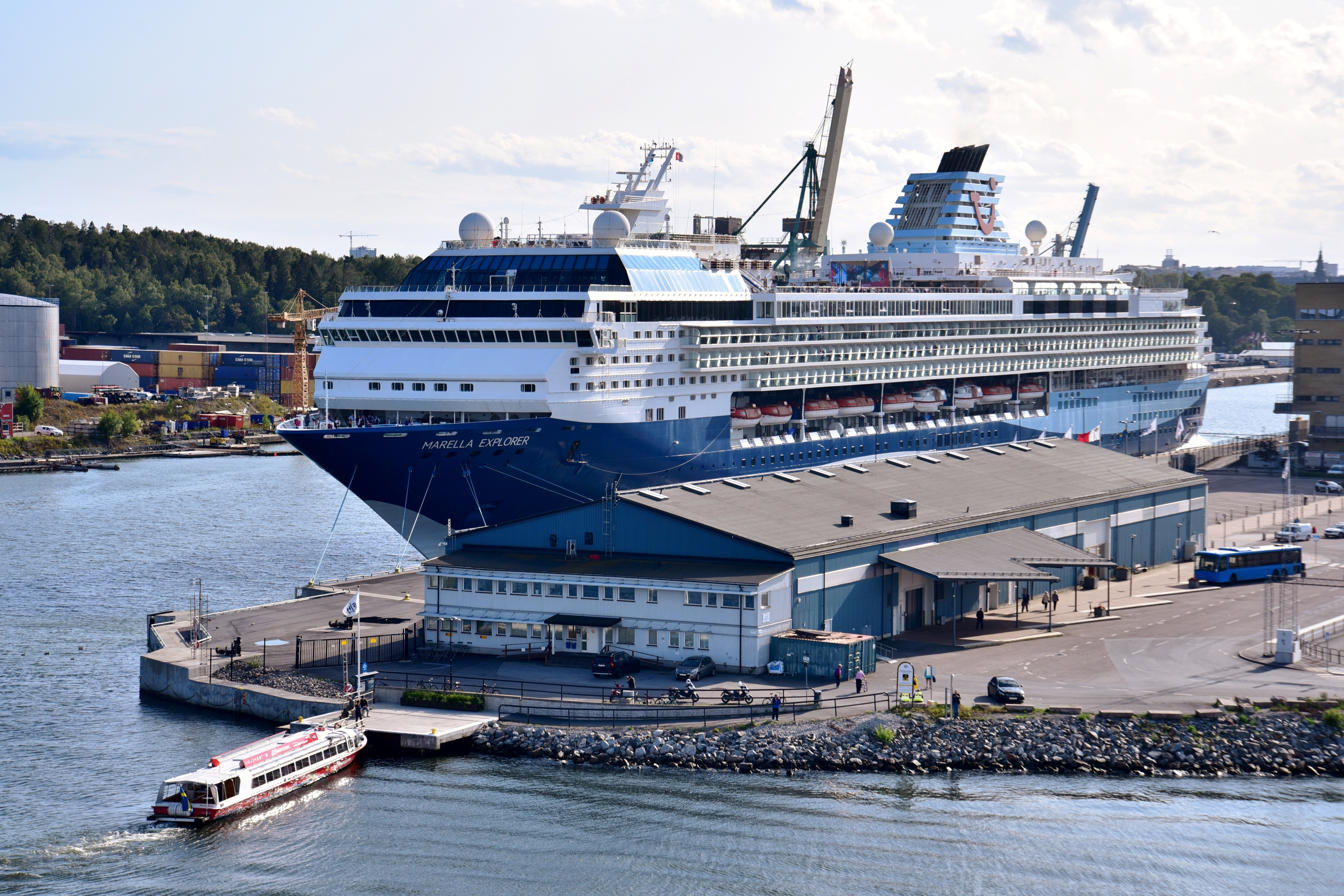
- Marella Explorer in Stockholm, 2019

History
- Name: 1996–2007: Galaxy; 2007–2009: Celebrity Galaxy; 2009–2010: Mein Schiff; 2010–2018: Mein Schiff 1; 2018 onwards: Marella Explorer
- Owner: 1996–1997: Celebrity Cruises; 1997–2018: Royal Caribbean Group; 2018-Present: TUI Group
- Operator: 1996–2009: Celebrity Cruises; 2009–2018: TUI Cruises; 2018-Present: Marella Cruises
- Port of registry: 1996–2002: Monrovia, Liberia; 2002–2008: Nassau, Bahamas; 2008 onwards: Valletta, Malta
- Builder: Meyer Werft, Papenburg, Germany
- Cost: $320 million
- Yard number: 638
- Laid down: 25 May 1995
- Launched: May 1996
- Acquired: 10 October 1996
- In service: 21 December 1996
- Identification: Call sign: 9HJH9; IMO number: 9106297; MMSI number: 249051000
- Status: In service

General characteristics
- Class & type: Century-class cruise ship
- Tonnage: 76,998 GT; 6,500 DWT
- Length: 259.70 m (852 ft 0 in)
- Beam: 32.20 m (105 ft 8 in)
- Draught: 7.70 m (25 ft 3 in)
- Decks: 10 (passenger accessible)
- Installed power: 2 × MAN B&W 9L48/60; 2 × MAN B&W 6L48/60 diesels; 29,250 kW (combined)
- Propulsion: Twin propellers
- Capacity: 1,924 passengers
- Crew: 909

Marella Explorer is a Century-class cruise ship owned and operated by Marella Cruises. Before joining Marella she cruised as MV Galaxy with Celebrity Cruises, and later as Mein Schiff with TUI Cruises. She was laid down at the Meyer Werft shipyard in Papenburg, Germany, on 25 May 1995, was launched in May 1996, and was delivered to Celebrity Cruises on 10 October 1996. She entered service on 21 December 1996.

In 2008, after some twelve years of service as Galaxy, she was renamed Celebrity Galaxy. In May 2009, she was transferred to the fleet of TUI Cruises, a joint venture between TUI AG and Celebrity Cruises' owner Royal Caribbean Cruises Ltd. She was renamed Mein Schiff (English: My Ship) on 15 May 2009, Mein Schiff 1 in November 2010, and Marella Explorer in 2018.

== Service history ==
=== Concept and construction ===
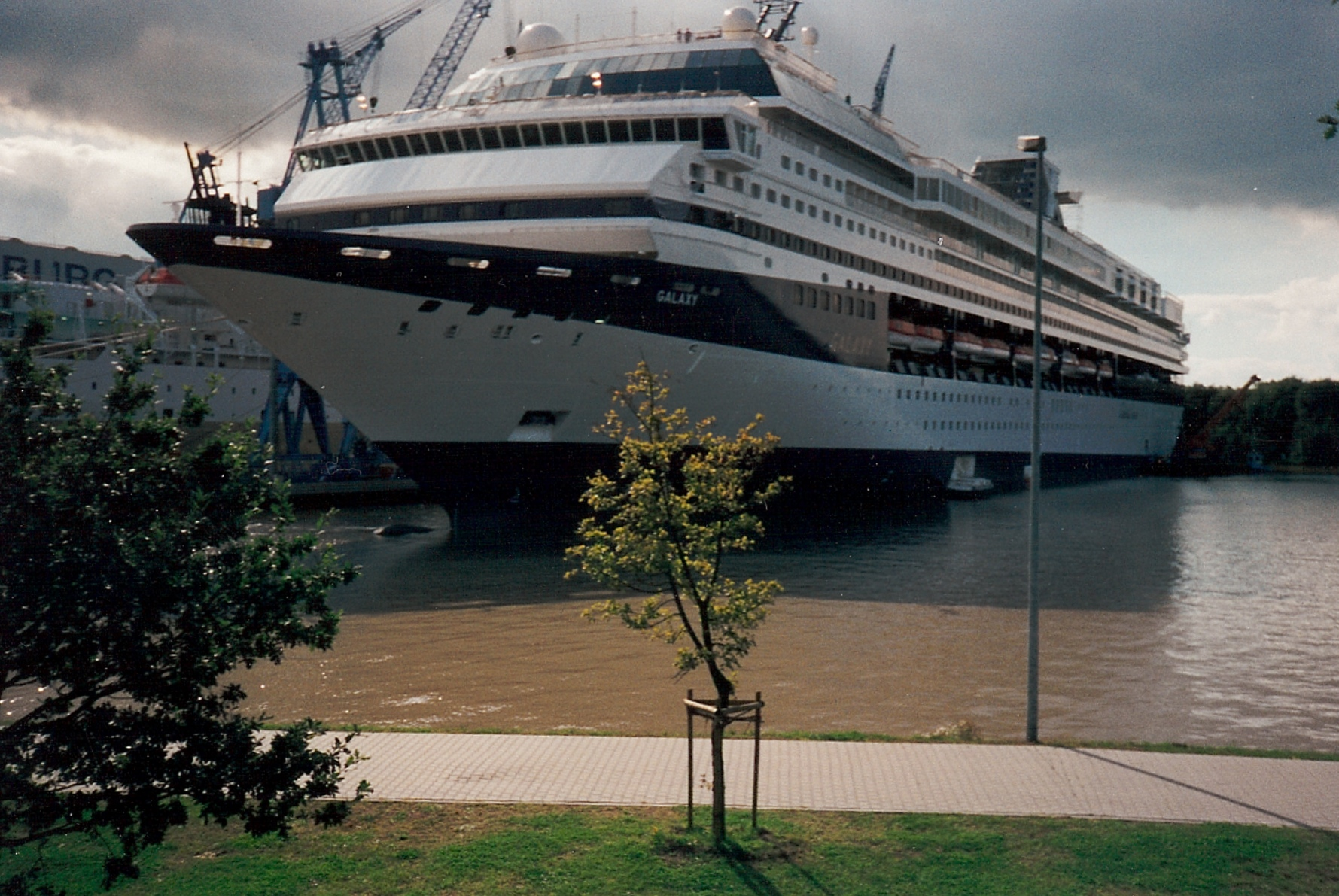
Galaxy in the Meyer Werft shipyard in 1996 just prior to her christening.

In March 1993 Celebrity Cruises had placed an order with the Meyer Werft shipyard in Papenburg, Germany for a new ship that was eventually delivered as MV Century. The contract also included an option for two additional vessels of the same design. Celebrity Cruises decided to utilize the option for additional vessels, but changes to the overall design were made to the subsequent ships compared to the Century. Therefore, the second ship, MV Galaxy, was given a 15.4-metre (50 ft 6 in) longer hull compared to the Century, and the galley and pantry areas were completely redesigned. In the passenger areas, this extra length allowed the addition of a small atrium-like space just ahead of the aft lifts, which was used for an extra bar (deck 5) extra lounge seating (deck 6) and a Sushi Bar (deck 7).

The keel of the Galaxy was laid on 25 May 1995, she was launched from drydock in May 1996 and delivered to Celebrity Cruises on 10 October 1996. Following a promotional visit to Southampton, the ship sailed across the Atlantic Ocean without passengers. Further promotional visits in Boston, Philadelphia and Port Canaveral followed, after which the ship sailed to Port Everglades to begin her commercial career with Celebrity Cruises.

=== Celebrity Cruises ===
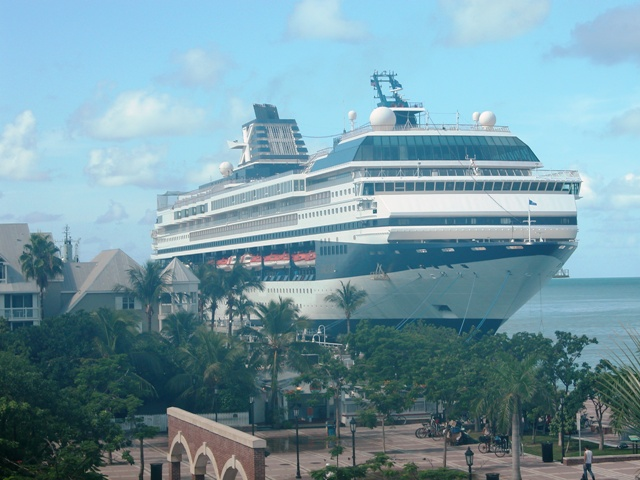
Galaxy docked in Key West

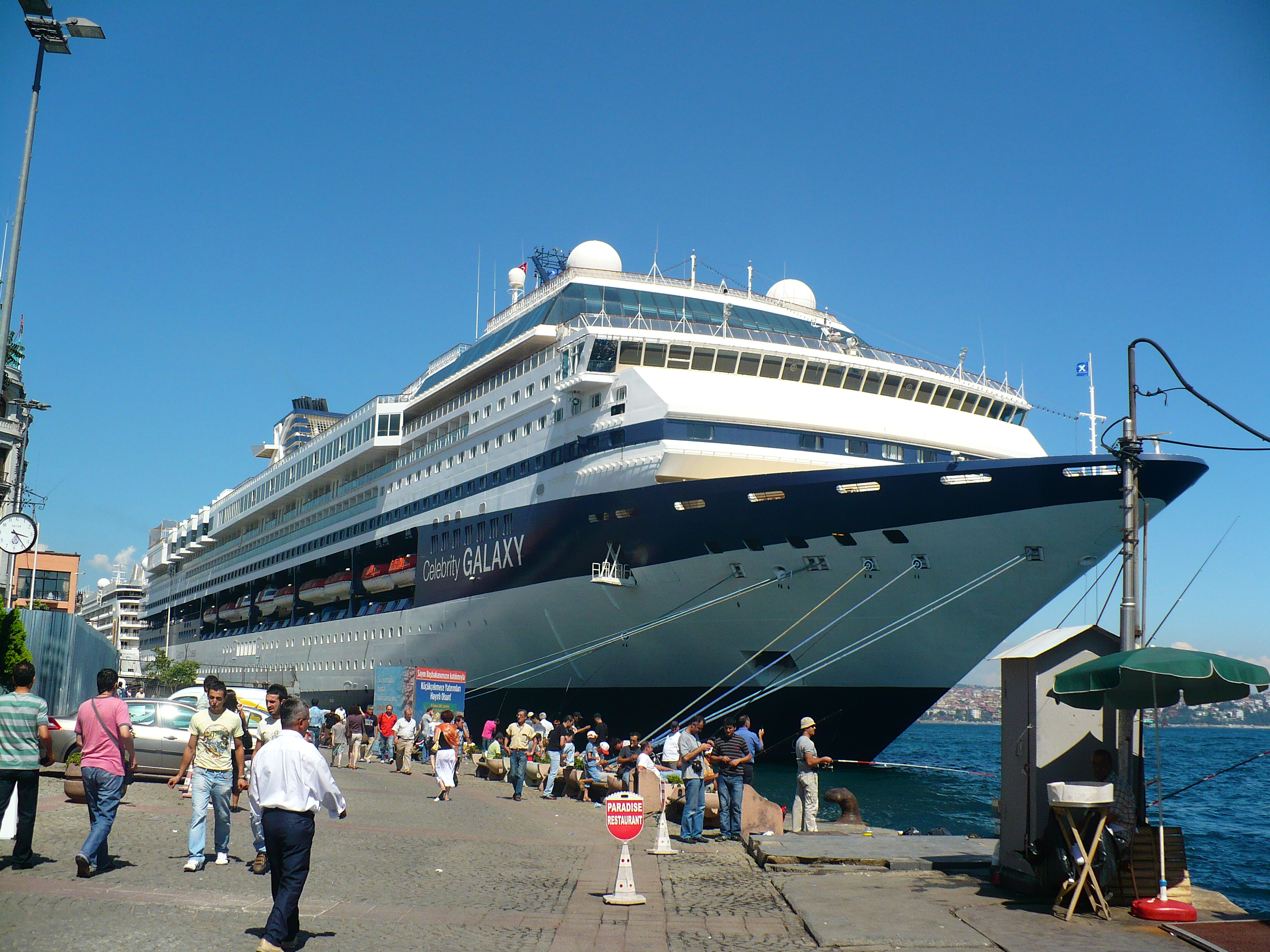
Celebrity Galaxy docked in Istanbul

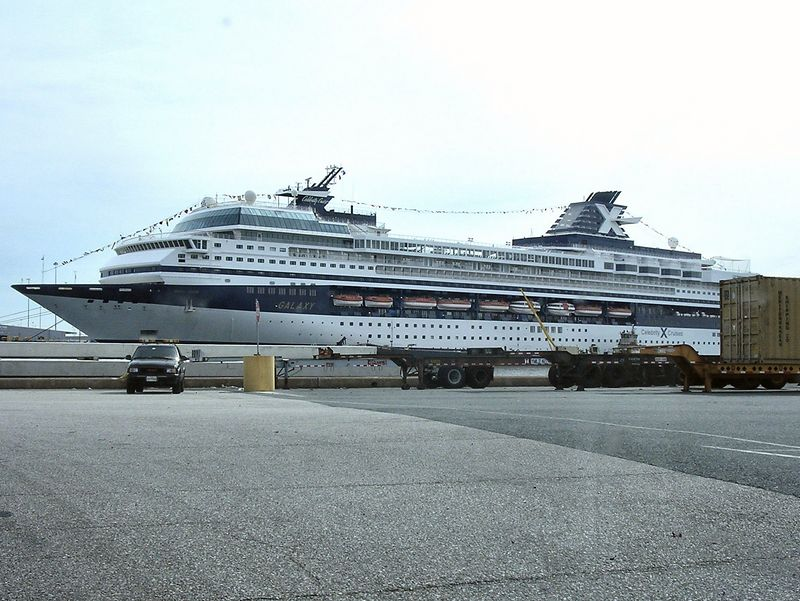
Galaxy at the Port of Hamburg In 2004.

Galaxy entered service with Celebrity Cruises on 21 December 1996 on a week-long cruise from Port Everglades to the Caribbean. Galaxy's maiden voyage was documented on the BBC television series The Cruise, which aired in 1998 and launched Jane McDonald's career as a recording artist.

Alongside her near-sister ship Century she operated week-long alternating western and eastern Caribbean cruises. During the 1997 Northern Hemisphere summer season the Galaxy relocated to the west coast of North America to operate week-long cruises to Alaska from Vancouver, British Columbia, Canada. This pattern was repeated from 1997 up until 2000.

For the 2001 summer season, Galaxy was replaced by the brand-new GTS Infinity in the Alaskan service. As a result, Galaxy was relocated into European waters, cruising the Mediterranean and Baltic Seas. On 2 June 2001, while departing Amsterdam in the Netherlands for a two-week cruise the Galaxy touched bottom on an outskirt of Forteiland at IJmuiden due to heavy northwesterly squalls, resulting in major damage to the port side propeller. The ship returned to the Port of Amsterdam for inspection and disembarkation of the passengers. The cruise had to be cancelled as the Galaxy went into drydock at Blohm + Voss in Hamburg, Germany. There it was discovered that all four blades of the port side propeller would have to be replaced; however the ship only carried two spare blades on board. To solve the problem two extra propeller blades carried on board Galaxy's sister ship MV Mercury were flown from the Caribbean to Hamburg and installed on the Galaxy. Following repairs the ship re-entered service on 16 June 2001.

For the 2002 and 2003 summer seasons the Galaxy was based in Baltimore, making 10- and 11-day cruises to the Caribbean.

On 21 May 2004 the Galaxy berthed at Civitavecchia (Rome) and began its series of summer voyages in the Mediterranean. The Galaxy made multiple transatlantic crossings during the fall and winter seasons to take advantage of the Caribbean's tropical climate.

In February 2008 the Galaxy was renamed Celebrity Galaxy to comply with Celebrity Cruises' new naming scheme.

=== TUI Cruises ===
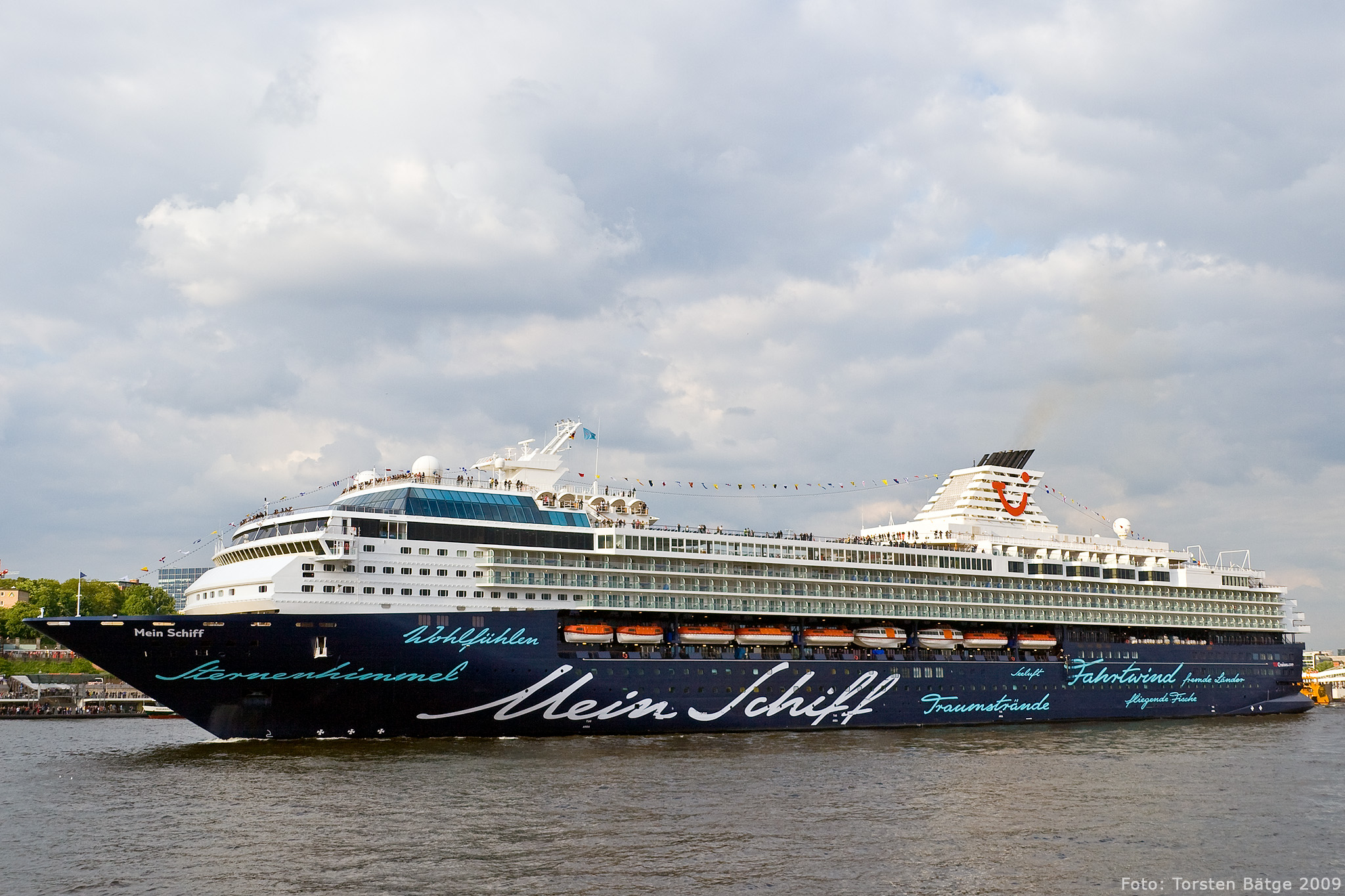
Mein Schiff at the Port of Hamburg prior to entering service with TUI Cruises.

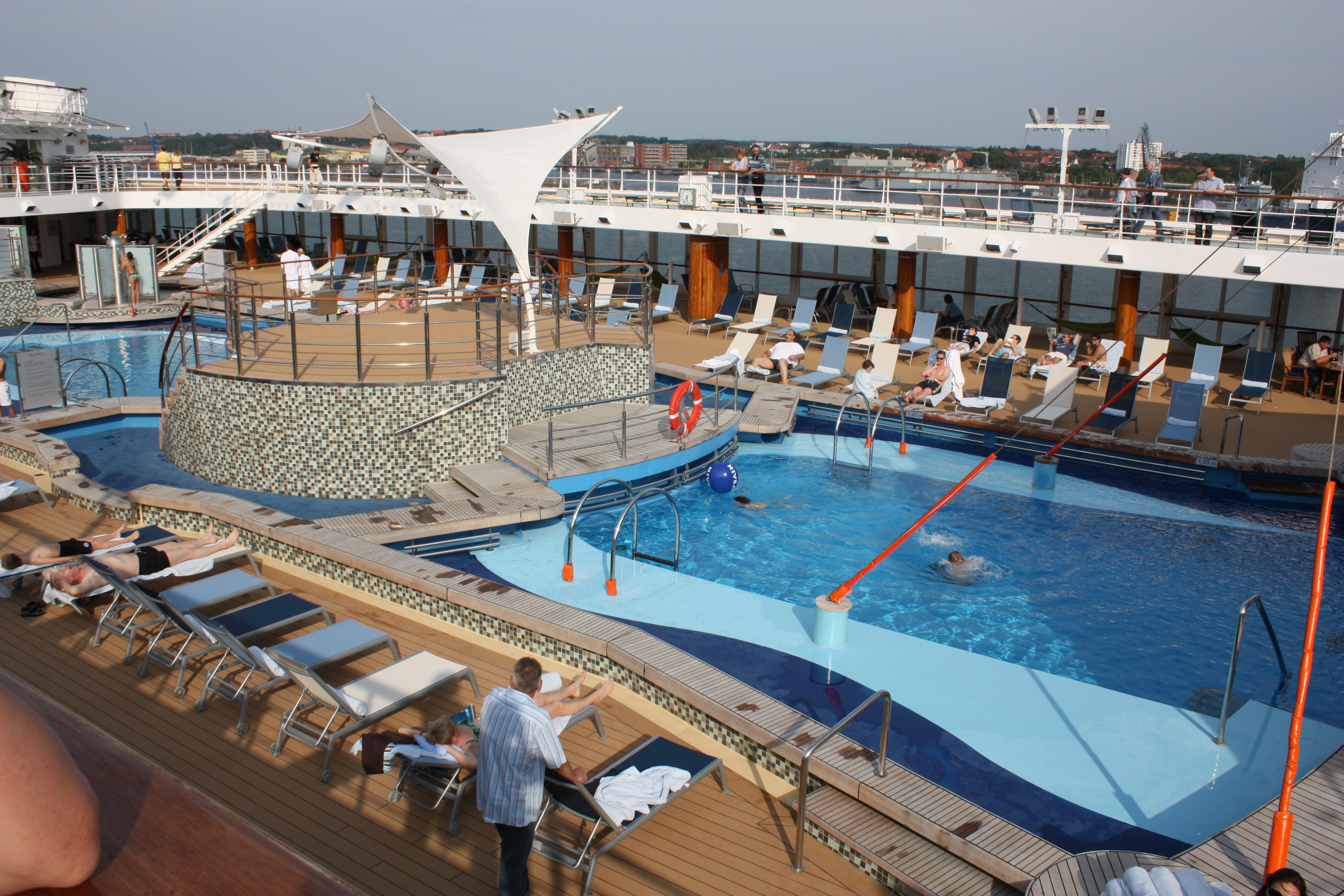
The ship's pool deck, 2009

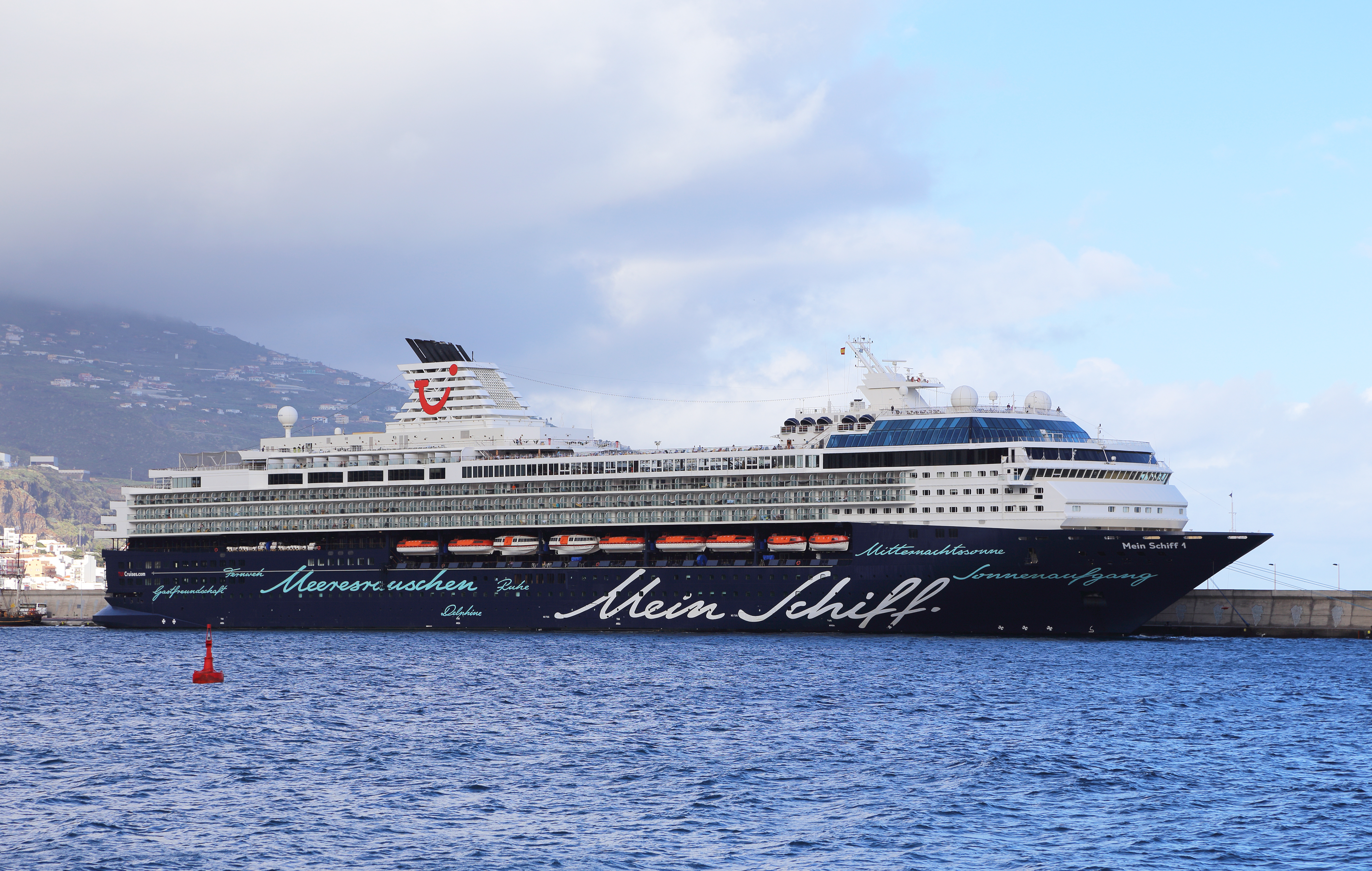
Mein Schiff 1 at Santa Cruz de La Palma

In April 2008 Royal Caribbean Cruises Ltd., the parent company of Celebrity Cruises, announced that the Celebrity Galaxy would cease service with Celebrity in March 2009 and subsequently be transferred to the fleet of TUI Cruises, a joint subsidiary of Royal Caribbean Cruises and TUI AG aimed at the German cruise market.

Following withdrawal from Celebrity Cruises' service, the ship sailed to the Lloyd Werft shipyard in Bremerhaven, Germany where she received a € 50 million refit to modernise her facilities and cabins to make her better suited for the needs of the German market. Additional balconies were also fitted on existing outside cabins. Following the 38-day refit the ship was renamed Mein Schiff in Hamburg on 15 May 2009, and she entered service with TUI Cruises on a Baltic Sea cruise starting from Kiel on 23 May 2009.

On 10 August 2014, the 76-meter-long service supply vessel Princess Marseilles struck the Mein Schiff 1 in the port of Bergen, Norway. The Mein Schiff 1 sustained minimal damage.

In the evening of 12 October 2014, around 9 p.m. a fire broke out in the incinerator on deck 3 while the cruise ship was en route from Barcelona to Palma de Mallorca with more than 2000 passengers. The crew was able to extinguish the fire within short time, and the ship docked as scheduled at Palma in the morning of 13 October. The message "Bravo, Bravo, Bravo, Fire in the Garbage" could accidentally be heard from the PA system. Some minutes later the master Rolf Johannes Noack notified the passengers about the incident. The show in the Theater had been interrupted until the fire was out. The passengers had remained calm.

== Marella Cruises ==
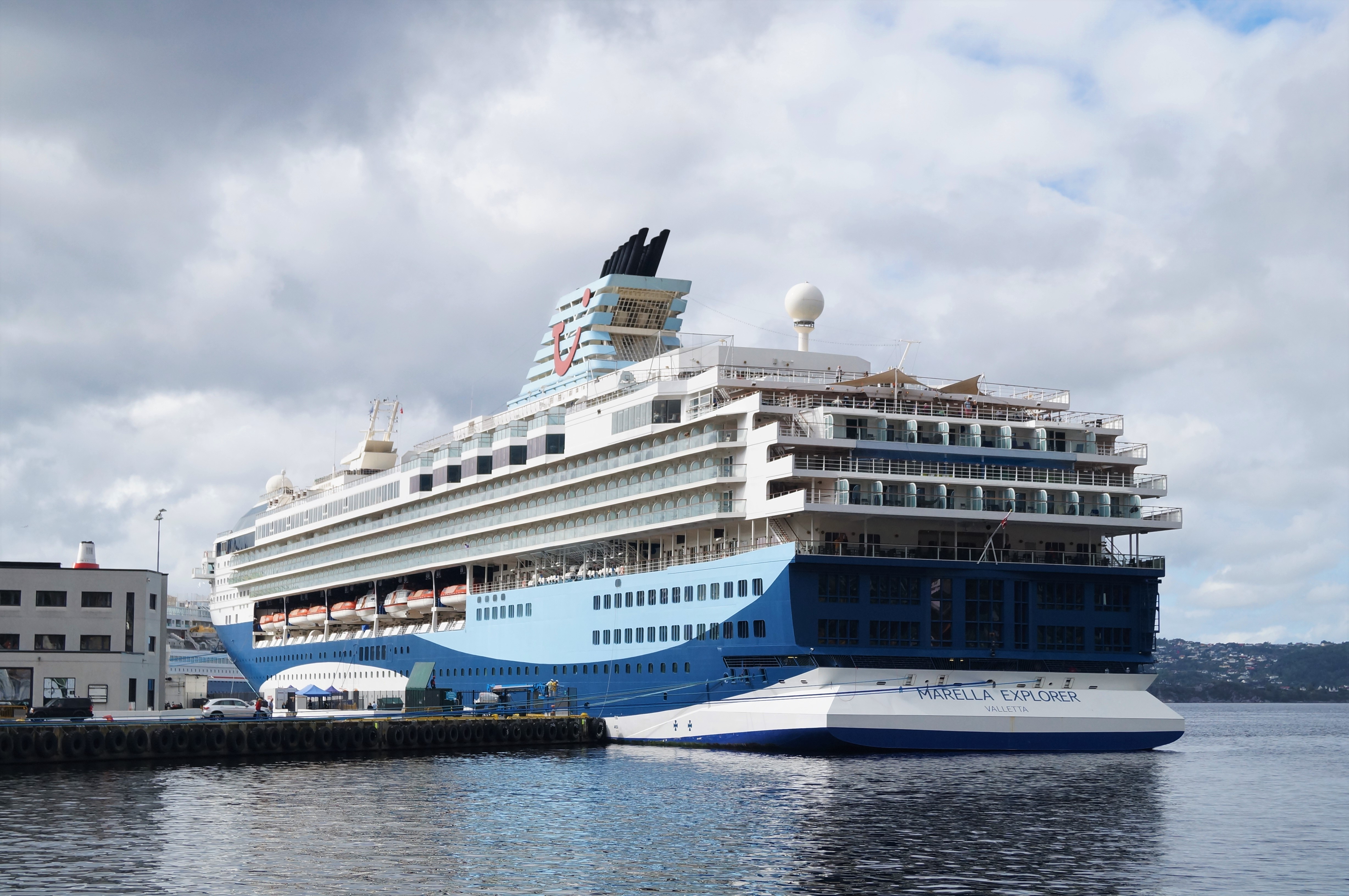
Marella Explorer In 2019

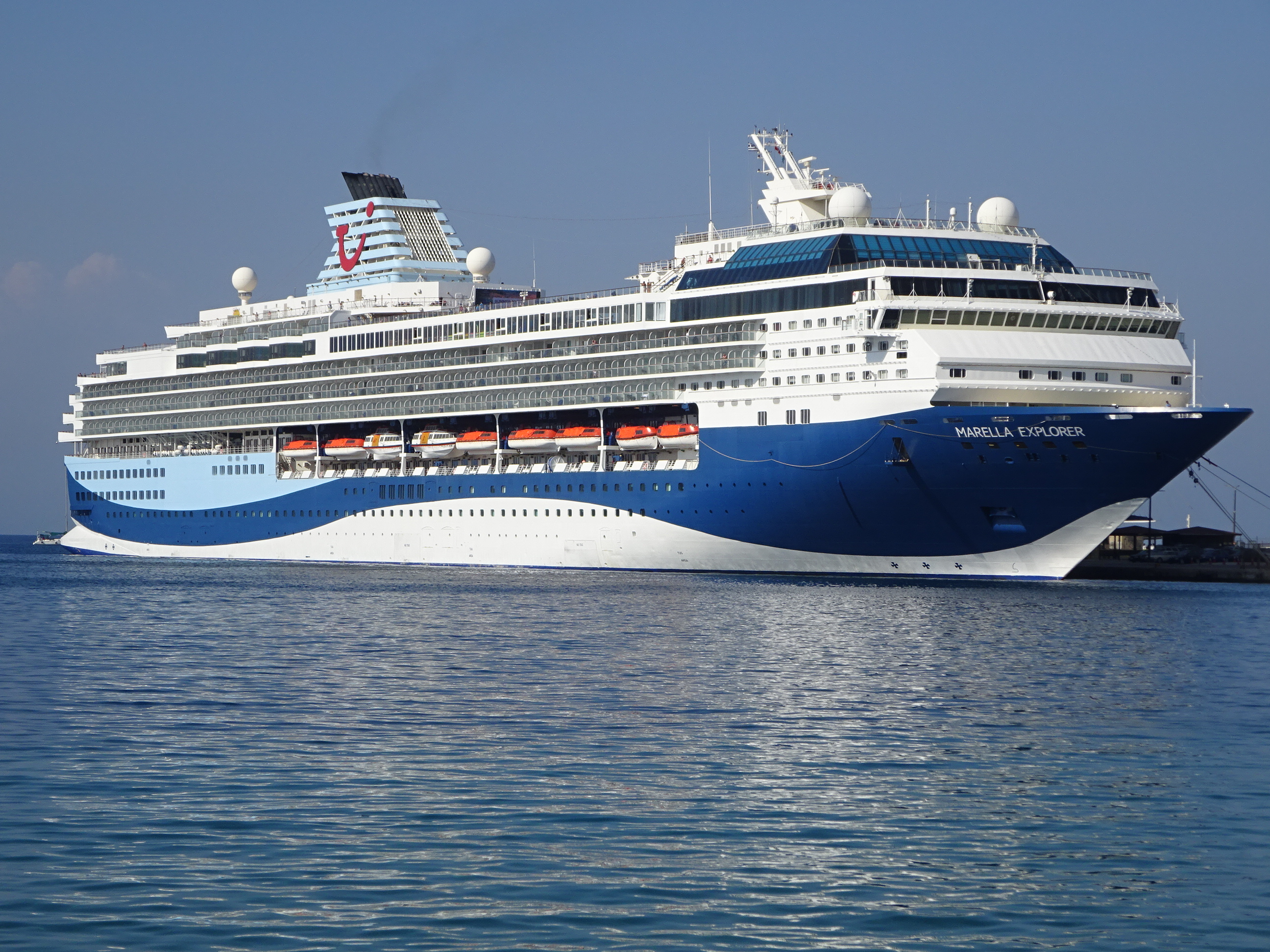
Marella Explorer In Rhodes in 2023

In May 2015, TUI Group announced that as part of their modernization strategy, TUI Cruises' Mein Schiff 1 and Mein Schiff 2 would be transferred to Thomson Cruises over the next few years.

In March 2017, it was announced that the ship would join the Marella Fleet in May 2018 and would be renamed TUI Explorer

In October 2017, it was announced that the ship will start operating under the company's new brand name Marella Explorer, after a Yard Refit in Cadiz.

In 2018, Marella Explorer underwent a 4-week, multi-million-pound makeover. The ship was drydocked in Cadiz, Spain.

== Architecture and equipment ==
The primary dining area on board the Marella Explorer can host 1,088 diners on a single seating, and is decorated in the art deco style utilized on ocean liners from the 1930s onwards.

== See also ==
- List of cruise ships
- Promotional Video from the 1990s
