= Marella Voyager =

Century-class cruise ship

- Marella Voyager in Rhodes, Greece, 2026

History
- Name: 1997–2008: Mercury; 2008–2011: Celebrity Mercury; 2011–2019: Mein Schiff 2; 2019–2023: Mein Schiff Herz; 2023 onwards: Marella Voyager
- Owner: 1997: Celebrity Cruises; 1997-2011: Royal Caribbean Group; 2011-Present: TUI Group
- Operator: 1997–2011: Celebrity Cruises; 2011–2023: TUI Cruises; 2023-Present: Marella Cruises
- Port of registry: 1997–2002: Panama City, Panama; 2002–2008: Nassau, Bahamas; 2008 onwards: Valletta, Malta
- Builder: Meyer Werft shipyard in Papenburg, Germany
- Yard number: 639
- Launched: 11 July 1997
- Christened: 27 October 1997
- Maiden voyage: 27 October 1997
- In service: 1997
- Identification: Call sign 9HJG9; IMO number: 9106302; MMSI number: 249053000
- Status: In active service

General characteristics
- Class & type: Century-class cruise ship
- Tonnage: 77,302 GT
- Length: 866 ft (264 m)
- Beam: 105.6 ft (32 m)
- Draft: 25.5 ft (8 m)
- Decks: 12
- Speed: 21.5 knots (39.8 km/h; 24.7 mph)
- Capacity: 1,912 passengers

Marella Voyager (formerly MV Mercury, Celebrity Mercury, Mein Schiff 2 and Mein Schiff Herz) is the second of two Century-class cruise ships operated by TUI Cruises. Built for Celebrity Cruises at the Meyer Werft shipyard in Papenburg, Germany, she was launched on 11 July 1997, and was christened and entered service as MV Mercury on 27 October 1997.

In 2008, after some eleven years in operation as Mercury, she was renamed Celebrity Mercury. In 2011, she was transferred to the fleet of TUI Cruises, a joint venture between TUI AG and Celebrity Cruises' owner Royal Caribbean Cruises Ltd. At the same time, she was renamed Mein Schiff 2.

In January 2019, she was again renamed, as Mein Schiff Herz. Her sister ship Marella Explorer is the former MV Galaxy, also previously operated by Celebrity Cruises.

In June 2023, the ship was renamed Marella Voyager, joining the Marella Cruises fleet.

== History ==
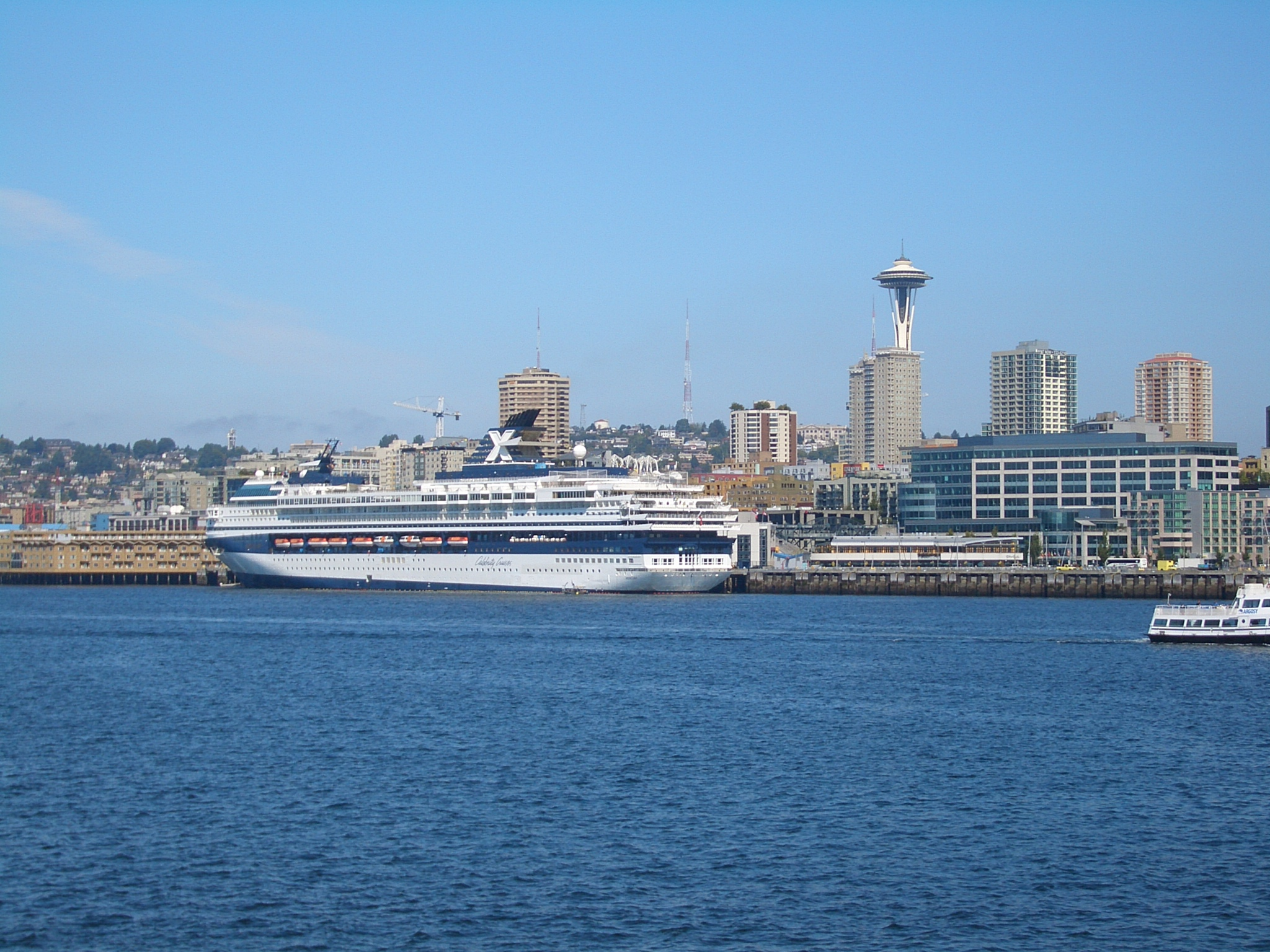
As Celebrity Mercury in 2006, docked in Seattle being inspected

On 19 May 2006, just prior to Mercury's planned departure for an Alaska cruise, Seattle-based inspectors from the U.S. Coast Guard arrested the captain of the Mercury for intoxication during a routine safety inspection. Celebrity Cruises arranged for a replacement, and fired the original captain.

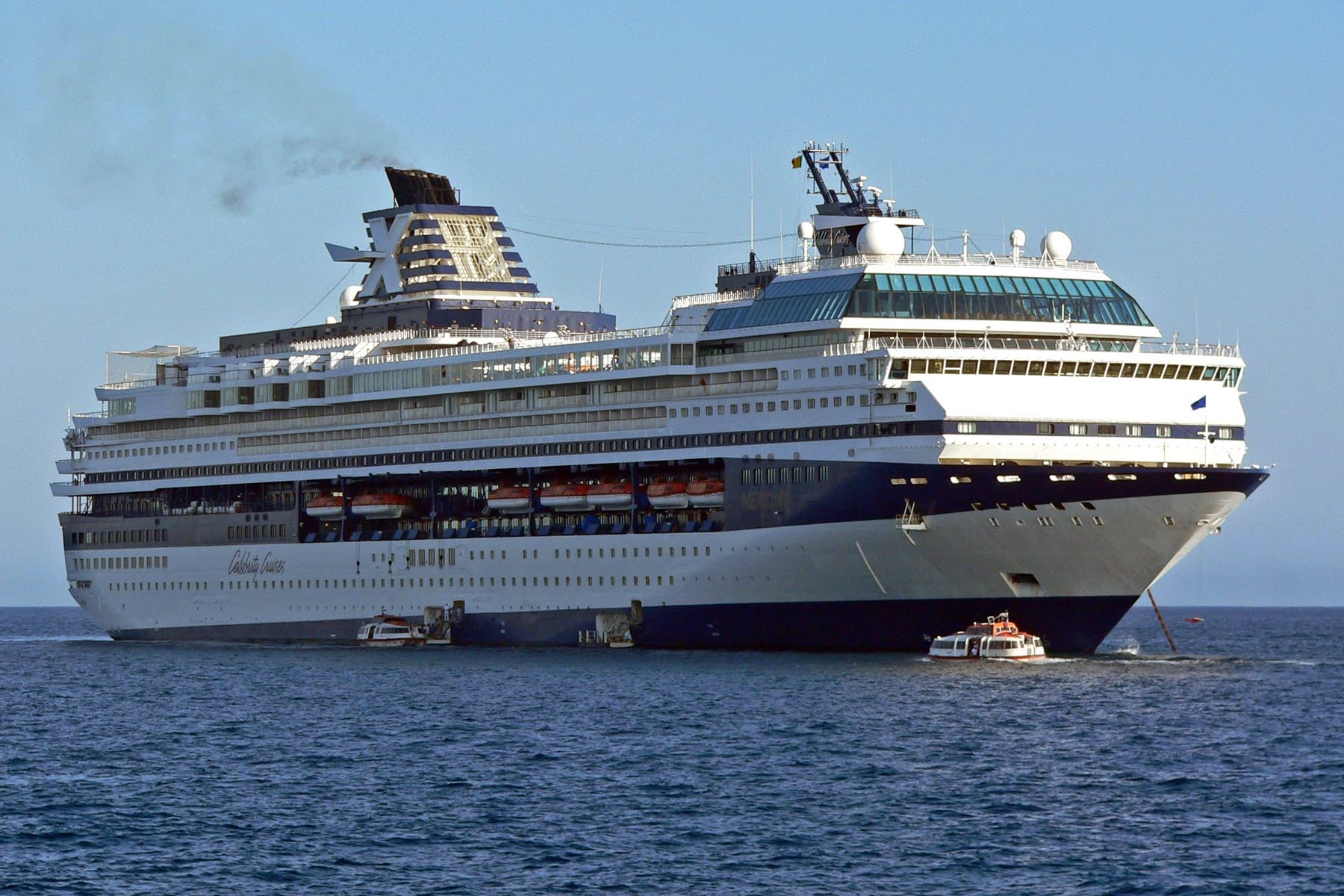
Mercury departing from Cabo San Lucas in 2005

While cruising from Charleston, South Carolina to the eastern Caribbean in February 2010, the ship was struck with a major outbreak of norovirus, affecting nearly 500 people on board, out of a total of just over 1,800. According to Celebrity Cruises, those taken ill were treated with over-the-counter medicine. Additionally, a doctor and two nurses joined the ship midway to assist with the outbreak.

== TUI Cruises ==
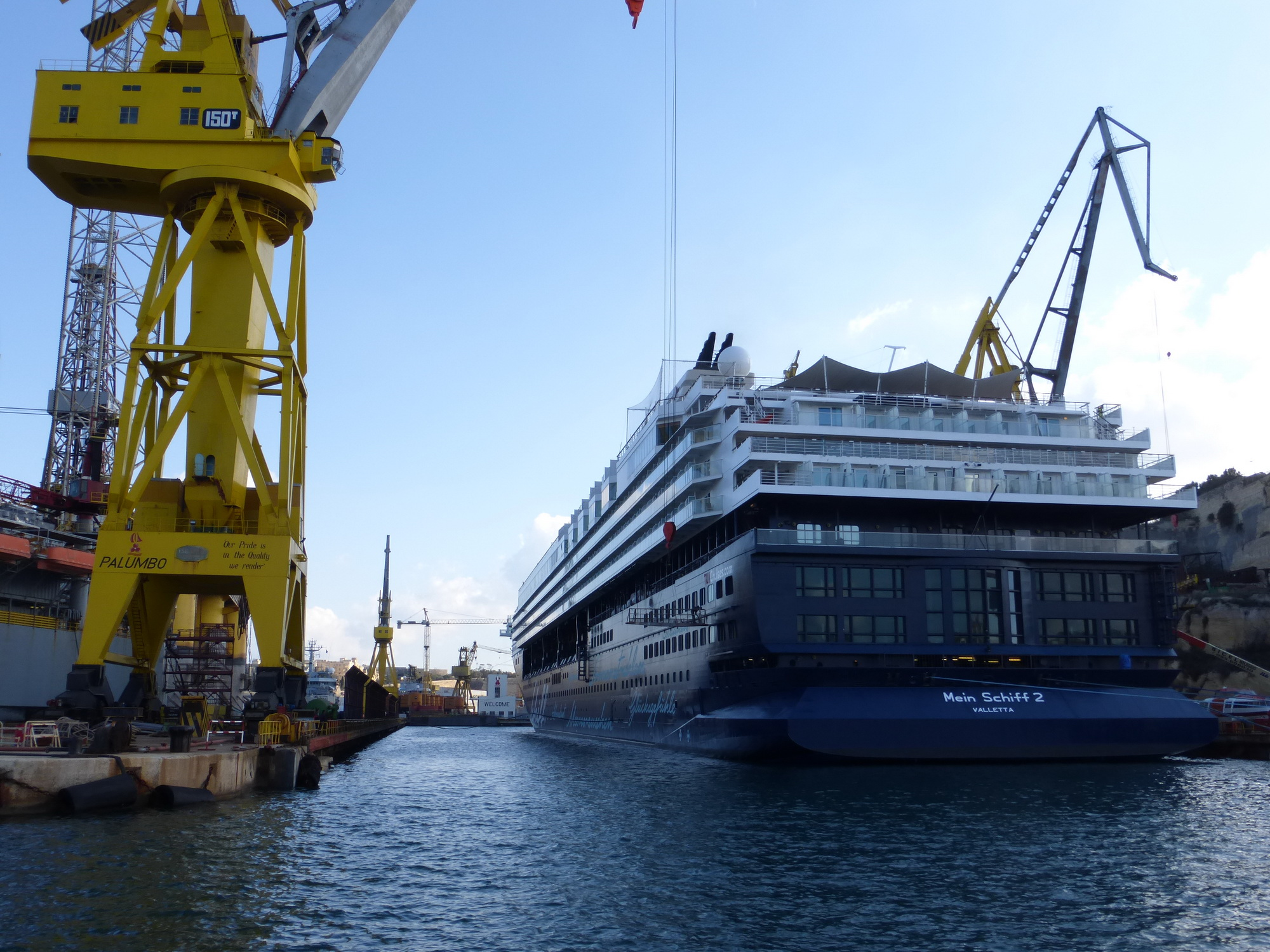
Mein Schiff 2 in the Chinese Dock in Valletta (2016)

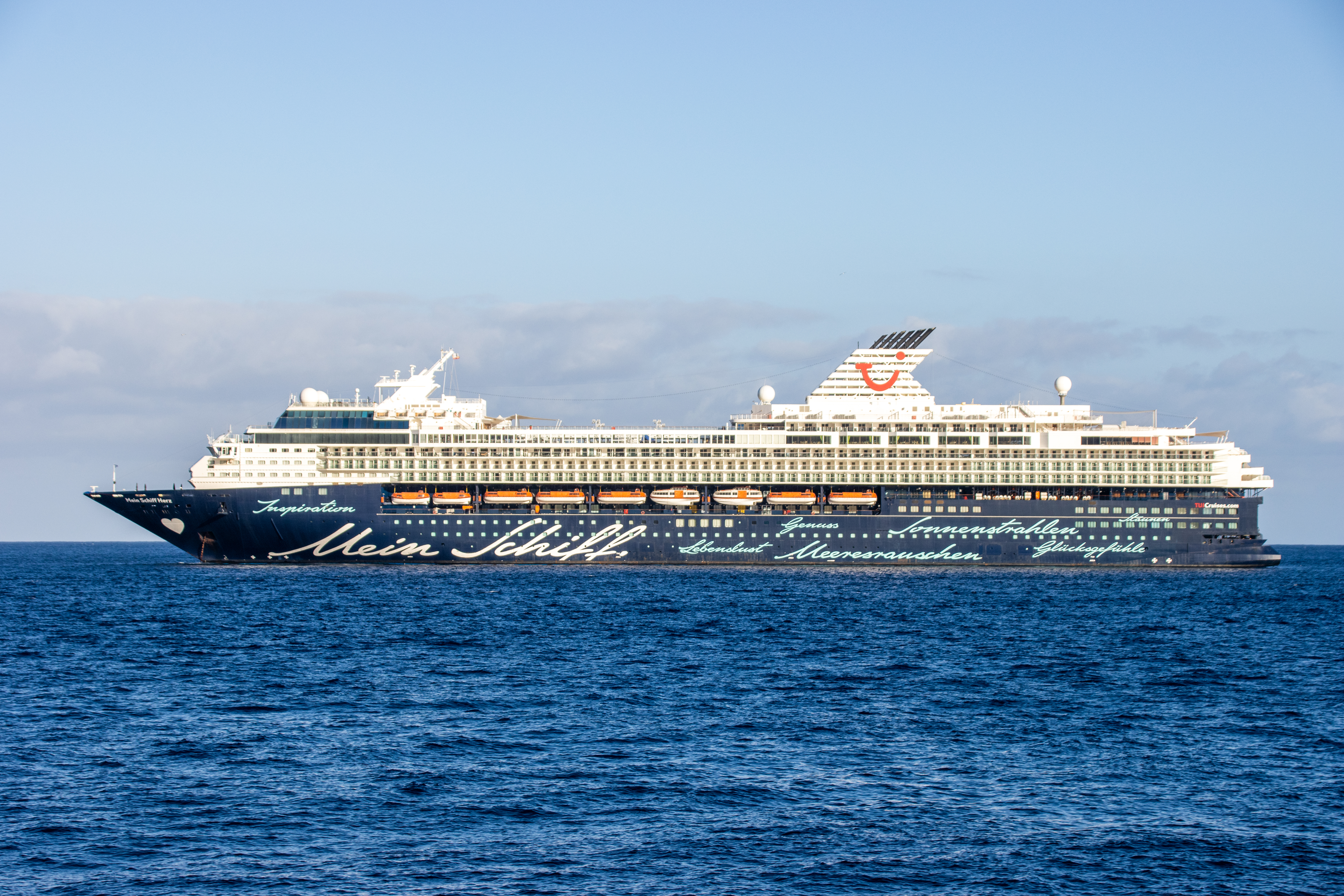
Mein Schiff Herz in Tenerife in May 2021

In February 2011 Celebrity Mercury left Celebrity Cruises to be renovated by Imtech and join TUI Cruises' fleet as Mein Schiff 2, alongside Mein Schiff 1, her sister ship, the former Celebrity Galaxy. In May 2015, TUI Group announced that as part of their modernization strategy, TUI Cruises' Mein Schiff 1 and Mein Schiff 2 would be transferred to Thomson Cruises over the next few years.

In March 2018 TUI Cruises announced that Mein Schiff 2 would remain in the fleet and sail under a new name. In October 2018 the name was announced as Mein Schiff Herz. It was also announced that she will be handed over to Marella Cruises in April 2022. A new ship, built in 2019, is now known as Mein Schiff 2.

== Marella Cruises ==
It was announced that the ship would be transferred to Marella Cruises in April 2022. Later, the transfer was delayed again to 2023. The ship finished her last voyage for TUI Cruises in April 2023. The ship then underwent a refit at Navantia in Cádiz and was renamed Marella Voyager. The christening ceremony happened on 31 May in Málaga.
