= Remi Eriksen =

- Born: (born 1967)
- Education: Norwegian Institute of Technology; Rice University
- Known for: Renewable Energy

Remi Eriksen (born 1967) is the current group president and chief executive officer of DNV, an international classification society and certification body. He assumed the position on August 1, 2015, succeeding former CEO Henrik O. Madsen.

Eriksen holds a master's degree in electronics and computer science from the Norwegian Institute of Technology (NTH).

From 2006 to 2010, he was a member of the OG21 Board of Norway and a board member for Maritime 21 between 2012 and 2015.

In October 2016, Eriksen was appointed as a member of Executive Committee at World Business Council for Sustainable Development (WBCSD).
