= GL Noble Denton =

- Industry: Oil & Gas
- Genre: Engineering & Consultancy
- Founded: 2010
- Area served: Worldwide
- Services: Engineering, Consultancy, Project Management, Certification & Software
- Number of employees: 3,600
- Parent: DNV
- Divisions: Americas, Europe, Middle East, Africa, Asia-Pacific

GL Noble Denton is one of the oil and gas businesses of DNV GL, headquartered in Hamburg, Germany and London, UK. The company is an independent technical advisor to industry operators across the world.

GL Noble Denton provides advice and services for upstream operations, such as onshore and offshore oil and gas exploration, production and delivery storage; midstream import, storage and processing; and downstream distribution.

GL Noble Denton provides services and software to design, develop, operate, execute, and assure oil and gas industry assets across the world. The company employs more than 3,600 people, and operates in more than 80 countries.

GL Noble Denton's technical experience covers fixed platforms, mobile offshore drilling units (MODU), floating production storage and offloading units (FPSOs), mobile offshore production units (MOPU), subsea and risers systems, offshore support vessels, tankers and shipping, onshore production, onshore and offshore pipelines, storage, import terminals, LNG facilities, refineries and petrochemical plants, transmission and distribution networks.

== Recent Awards ==
In December 2010, GL Noble Denton received a Gas Industry Safety Group (GISG) Award for safety-related research.

In May 2010, GL Noble Denton was awarded with an International Business Development Award, presented by the Institution of Gas Engineers and Managers (IGEM) and the Society of British Gas Industries (SBGI). The Award was presented in recognition of new safety and city gas projects commissioned to GL Noble Denton in Australia, Singapore, Vietnam, India and Thailand.

== Timeline ==
1867: Germanischer Lloyd (GL) founded as a maritime classification society.

1904: Noble Denton founded by Captain Pedder to undertake technical assurance and project execution of complex marine operations in London.

1961: Captain David Noble and Dr Tony Denton successfully expand the Noble Denton business offering combined of seafaring and gas engineering services to companies operating in the North Sea.

1970s: Noble Denton expands its global reach by opening offices in the Far East, Brazil, US, UAE and Norway.

1976: GL diversifies its business offering to include technical services in the oil and gas industry.

2003: Noble Denton acquires Martech Unlimited Inc (USA).

2004: Noble Denton acquires BOMEL Ltd. (UK)

2007: Noble Denton acquires Intelligent Decisions (Norway), Poseidon Maritime Ltd. (UK), and Lowe Offshore International Inc (US)

2007: GL acquires Advantica (UK), Materials Consulting Services (US), and PVI Inspection (Canada)

2008: GL acquires Trident Consultants (Malaysia)

2008: Noble Denton acquires Standard Engineering AS and Brevik Engineering AS (Norway)

2009: GL acquires International Refinery Services (Singapore)

2009: GL merges with Noble Denton

2010: GL Noble Denton is launched, combining Noble Denton and the oil and gas division of Germanischer Lloyd.

2013: GL merges with DNV, forming DNV GL.
