= Mein Schiff Relax =

Cruise ship

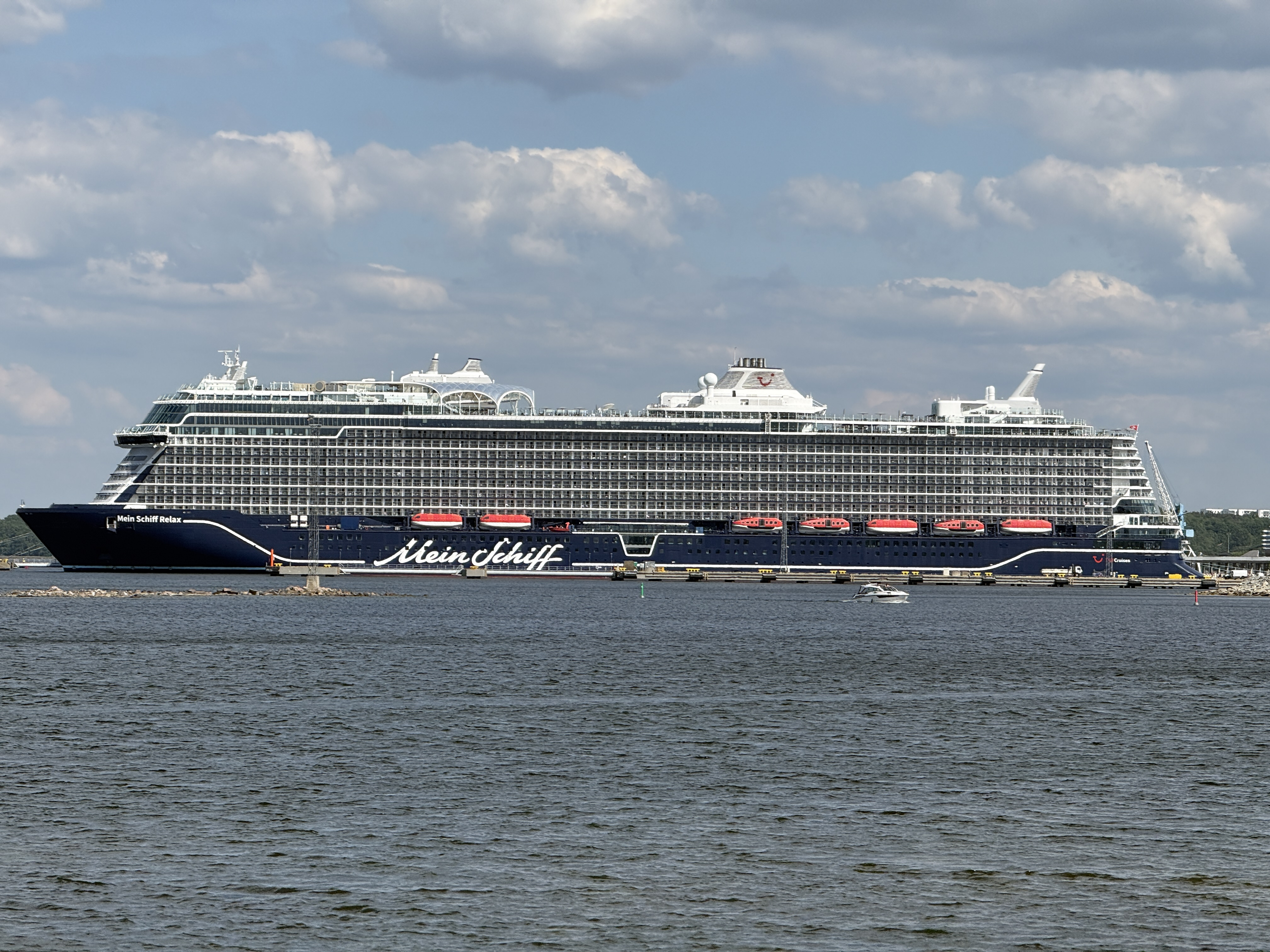
- Mein Schiff Relax

History
- Name: Mein Schiff Relax
- Operator: TUI Cruises
- Port of registry: Valletta, (Malta)
- Ordered: 12 July 2018
- Builder: Fincantieri, Monfalcone, Italy
- Yard number: 6312
- Launched: 28 November 2023
- Christened: 9 April 2025
- Acquired: 7 February 2025
- Maiden voyage: 2 March 2025
- Identification: IMO number: 9862657
- Status: In service

General characteristics
- Type: Cruise ship
- Tonnage: 160,000 GT
- Length: 333 m (1,092 ft 6 in)
- Beam: 42.1 m (138 ft 1 in)
- Decks: 19
- Speed: 22 knots (41 km/h; 25 mph)
- Capacity: 3,984 passengers
- Crew: 1,400

Mein Schiff Relax is an InTUItion-class ship built for German cruise line TUI Cruises. The ship is the first in a new class for the cruise line, with energy efficiency in mind that debuted in March 2025.

== Design and construction ==
The ship was ordered by TUI Cruises in 2018 as the first of two new concept LNG-powered ships. At the time of the order, it was to be the largest cruise ship built in Italy. The design was based on the Project Mille prototype platform developed by Fincantieri. A sister ship, Mein Schiff Flow, will debut in 2026, with two additional unnamed sister ships in 2031 and 2032. This new prototype is TUI Cruise's first new design since Mein Schiff 3 debuted in 2014.

The ship was designed with energy efficiency in mind, with dual-fuel configuration, being able to operate on LNG or marine gas oil, and has the ability to transition to alternatives including bio- or e-LNG when it becomes available in the market. Mein Schiff Relax also features new catalytic converters meeting Euro 6 standards, a generative turbine using residual heat from the diesel generators that ensures almost emission-free operations while in port, and a shore power connection for ports.

A team of notable cruise ship designers and architects designed the layout and spaces of Mein Schiff Relax. The overall masterplan for the ship was completed by Wilson Butler Architects who also designed the entertainment venues, with other areas designed by 3Deluxe, Tillberg Design of Sweden, and JOI-Design.

The first steel was cut in June 2022, with the bow section being constructed at the VARD shipyard in Tulcea, Romania. The section was later towed to Fincantieri's Monfalcone yard where the ship would be assembled and completed. In October 2023, it was announced that the ship would be named Mein Schiff Relax, a departure from TUI's numbering convention of their past ships.

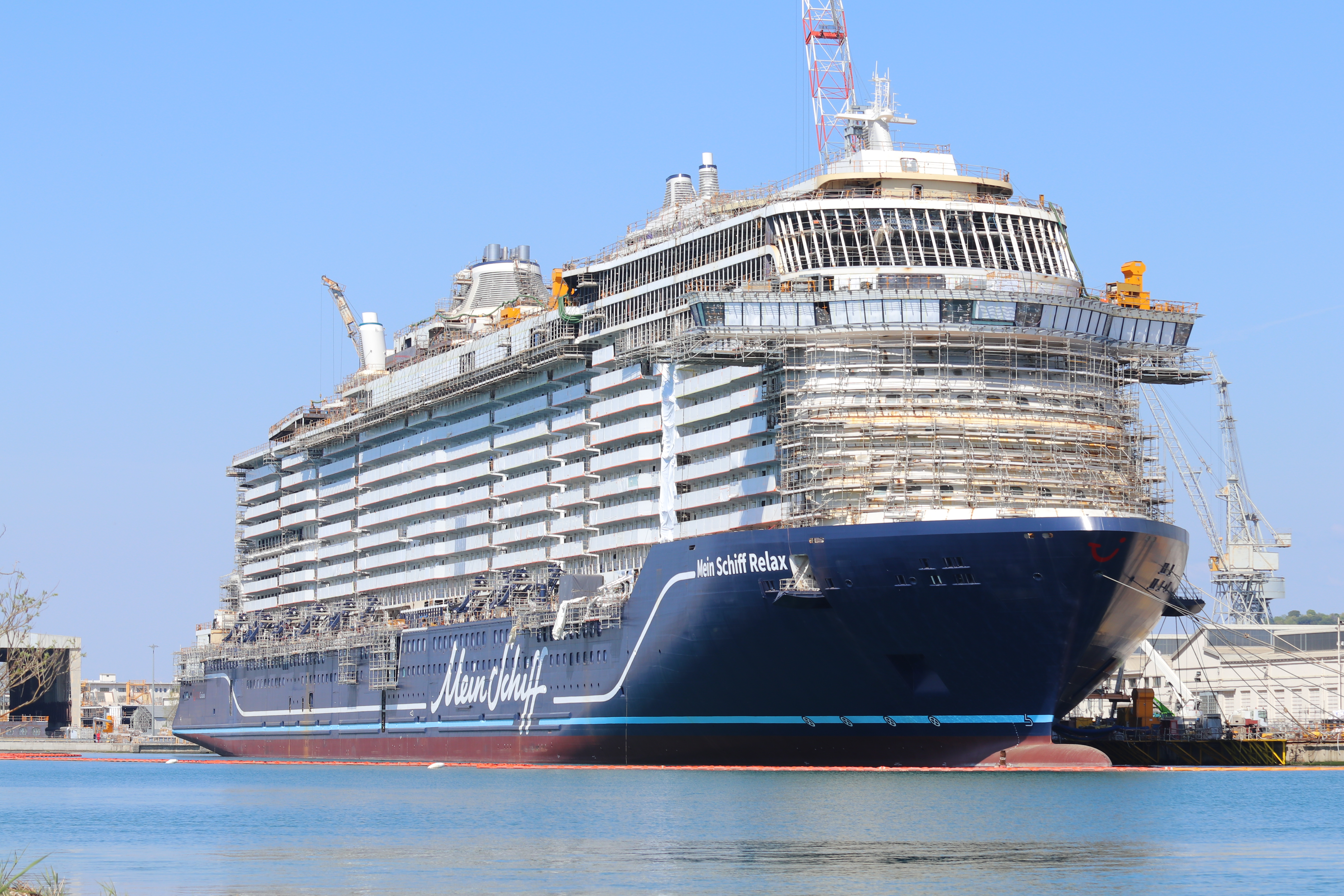
Mein Schiff Relax under construction at Monfalcone, Italy

Mein Schiff Relax was floated out in November 2023 with honorary godmother Elena Sperti, an employee of the shipyard. The ship embarked on its first sea trials in October 2024, traveling from Monfalcone to Palermo, where she was dry-docked before returning to the shipyard for completion. The ship held the second sea trials in December.

On 7 February 2025, Mein Schiff Relax was officially delivered to TUI Cruises. A handover ceremony was held at the Fincantieri shipyard in Monfalcone, Italy. The ship was moved to Fincantieri's Trieste shipyard, and on 24 February 2025 departed for a repositioning pre maiden voyage from Trieste, Italy to her homeport of Palma de Mallorca.

== Service history ==
Mein Schiff Relax debuted on 2 March 2025, with a series of Mediterranean cruises from Palma de Mallorca. It was announced that British singer Robbie Williams will be the feel-good ambassador of Mein Schiff Relax and perform at the naming ceremony. A special christening ceremony was held on 9 April 2025, in the port of Málaga, Spain, with TUI Spa & Sport manager Giuliana Rizzo serving as godmother and Robbie Williams performing a concert. The ship was joined by Mein Schiff 5 and Mein Schiff 7.

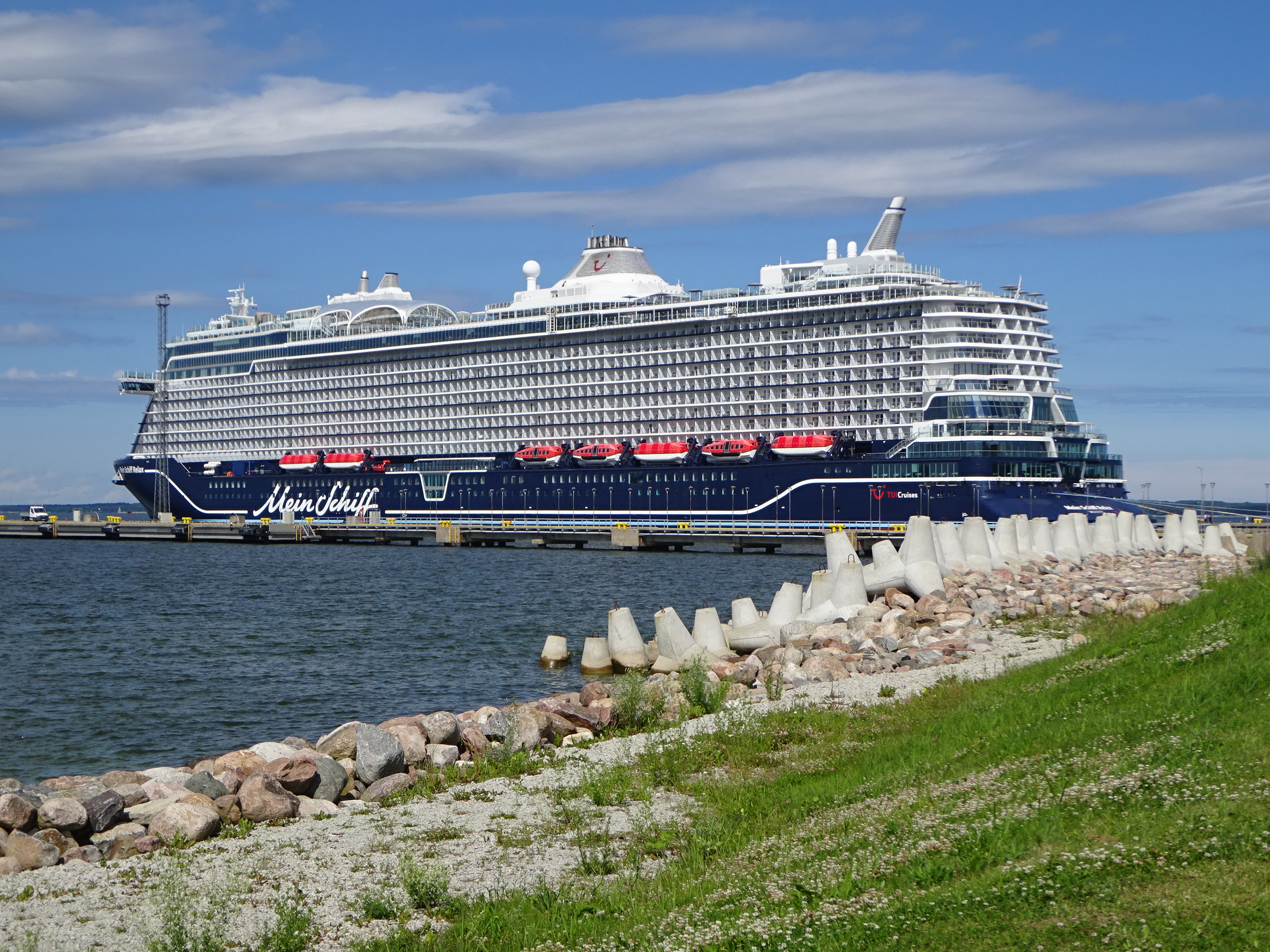
Mein Schiff Relax in Tallinn 2026

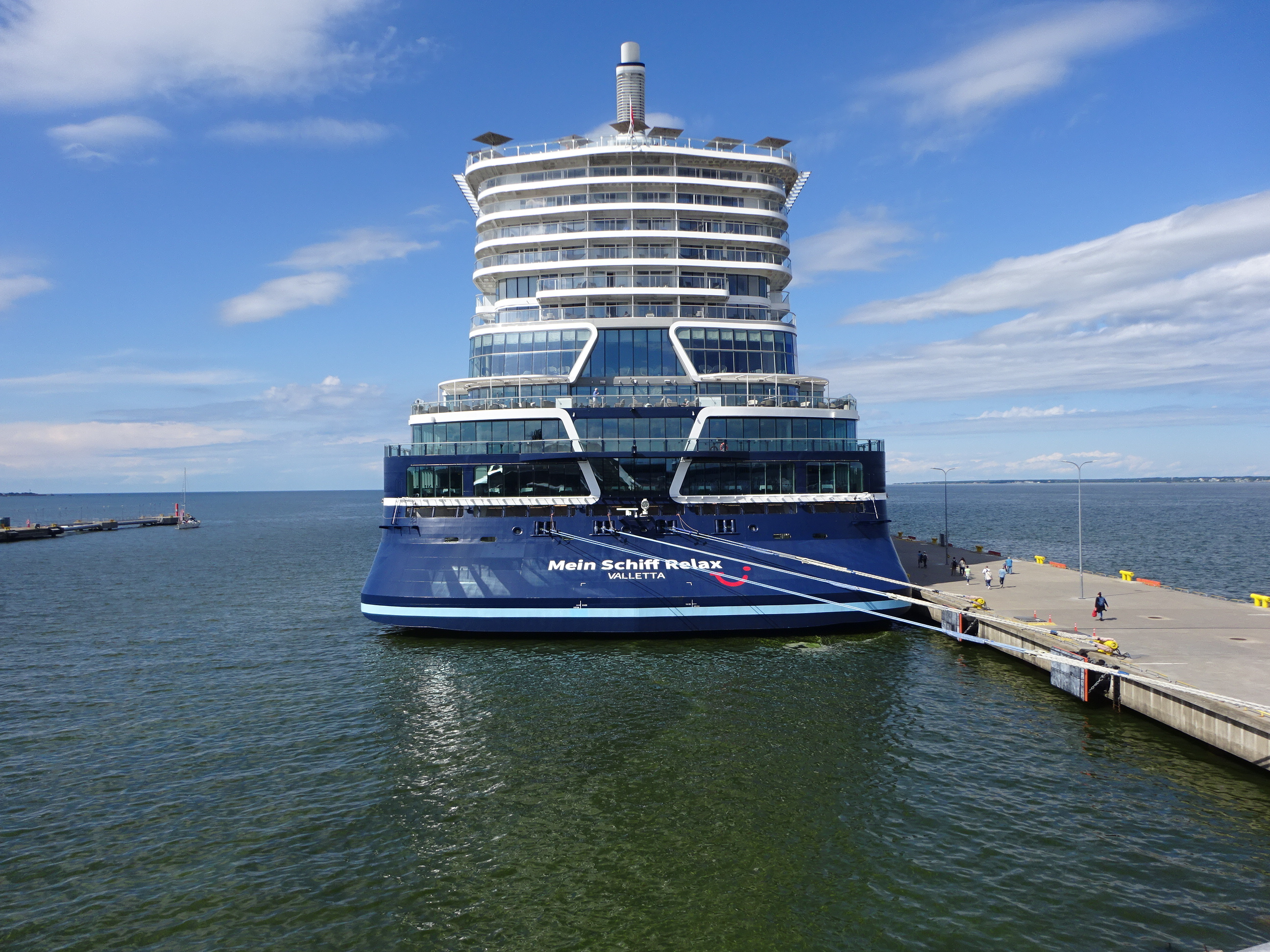
Stern view of Mein Schiff Relax
