= DNVGL-ST-E271 =

- 2.7-1 Offshore containers
- First published: 1989
- Latest version: 2017
- Preview version: 2015
- Organization: DNV GL
- Base standards: MSC/Circ. 860, EN 12079

The DNVGL-ST-E271 (formerly DNV 2.7-1) is a regulation issued by DNV (actual DNV GL) regarding the offshore containers specifications.

DNV 2.7-1 was initially issued in 1989 and the most recent version “DNV Standard for Certification No. 2.7-1 Offshore Containers” was released in June 2013. It is a set of transport related requirements for offshore containers. It refers to: design, manufacture, testing, certification, marking and periodical inspection (will detail each of them later). The purpose was to insure that containers are safe and suitable for repeated use.

Prior to 1989 there was no specific regulation for offshore equipment handling and lifting although offshore container handling is significantly more dangerous than onshore. For offshore containers, the rate of wear and tear is higher than in most other environments. Containers are required to be constructed to withstand the forces encountered in offshore operations, and will not suffer complete failure even if subject to more extreme loads.

DNV 2.7-1 is fully compliant with EN 12079 part 1 (offshore containers) and part 2 (lifting sets) and distinct as regards part 3 (periodical inspection).
