= Mein Schiff 6 =

Cruise ship built in 2017

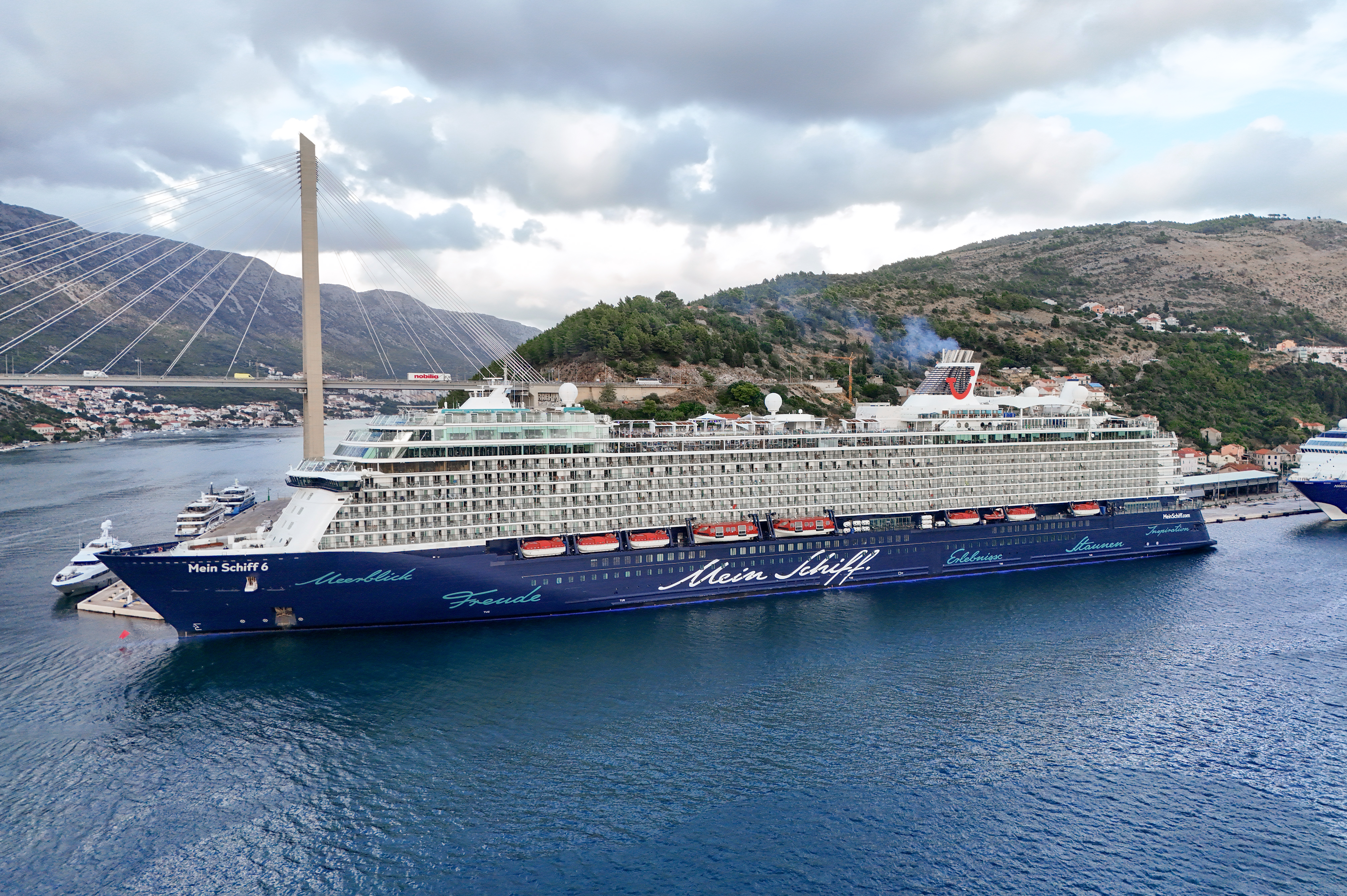
- Mein Schiff 6 docked in Dubrovnik in 2024.

History
- Name: Mein Schiff 6
- Owner: TUI Cruises
- Operator: TUI Cruises
- Port of registry: Valletta, Malta
- Ordered: 26 August 2014
- Builder: Meyer Turku Shipyard; Turku, Finland
- Yard number: 1390
- Laid down: 21 August 2015
- Launched: 3 January 2017
- Christened: 1 June 2017
- Completed: 8 May 2017
- Acquired: 9 May 2017
- Maiden voyage: 3 June 2017
- In service: 12 May 2017
- Identification: Call sign: 9HA4330; IMO number: 9753208; MMSI number: 249660000
- Status: In service

General characteristics
- Type: Cruise ship
- Tonnage: 98,811 GT; 62,704 NT; 7,900 DWT
- Length: 295.26 m (969 ft)
- Beam: 42.39 m (139 ft)
- Draft: 8.25 m (27 ft)
- Installed power: 48 MW; 2 × 9.6 MW Wärtsilä 8L46F; 2 × 14.4 MW Wärtsilä 12V46F
- Propulsion: Diesel-electric; Two shafts; fixed pitch propellers; Three bow thrusters; Two stern thrusters
- Capacity: 2,534 passengers
- Crew: 1,030

Mein Schiff 6 is a cruise ship owned by TUI Cruises.

Mein Schiff 6 is similar to Mein Schiff 3, Mein Schiff 4, and Mein Schiff 5 with only minor differences to its sister vessels.

== COVID-19 incident ==
On 28 September 2020, it was initially reported that 12 crew members of Mein Schiff 6 tested positive for COVID-19 as part of a routine sampling test. The ship was on the route Heraklion (Crete) - Piraeus - Corfu, and continued towards Piraeus for further investigation of the incident. The following morning it was reported that all 12 previously positive crew had now tested negative fuelling uncertainty as to the result of the original tests, while as 2 October, the ship has been given the all clear to continue its journey to Corfu, showing that the incident was almost certainly a false alarm.

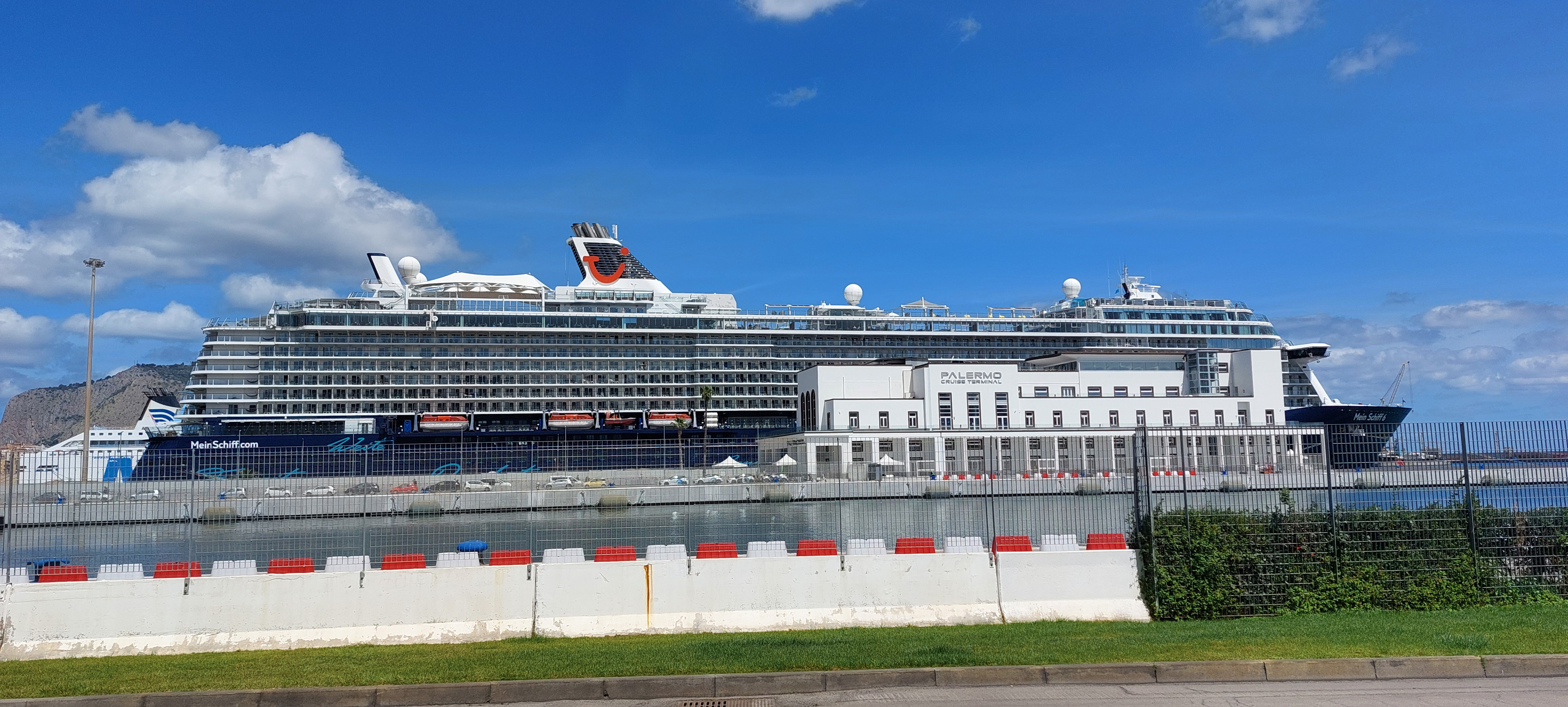
Mein Schiff 6 moored at Port of Palermo
