= Mein Schiff 3 =

Cruise ship built in 2014

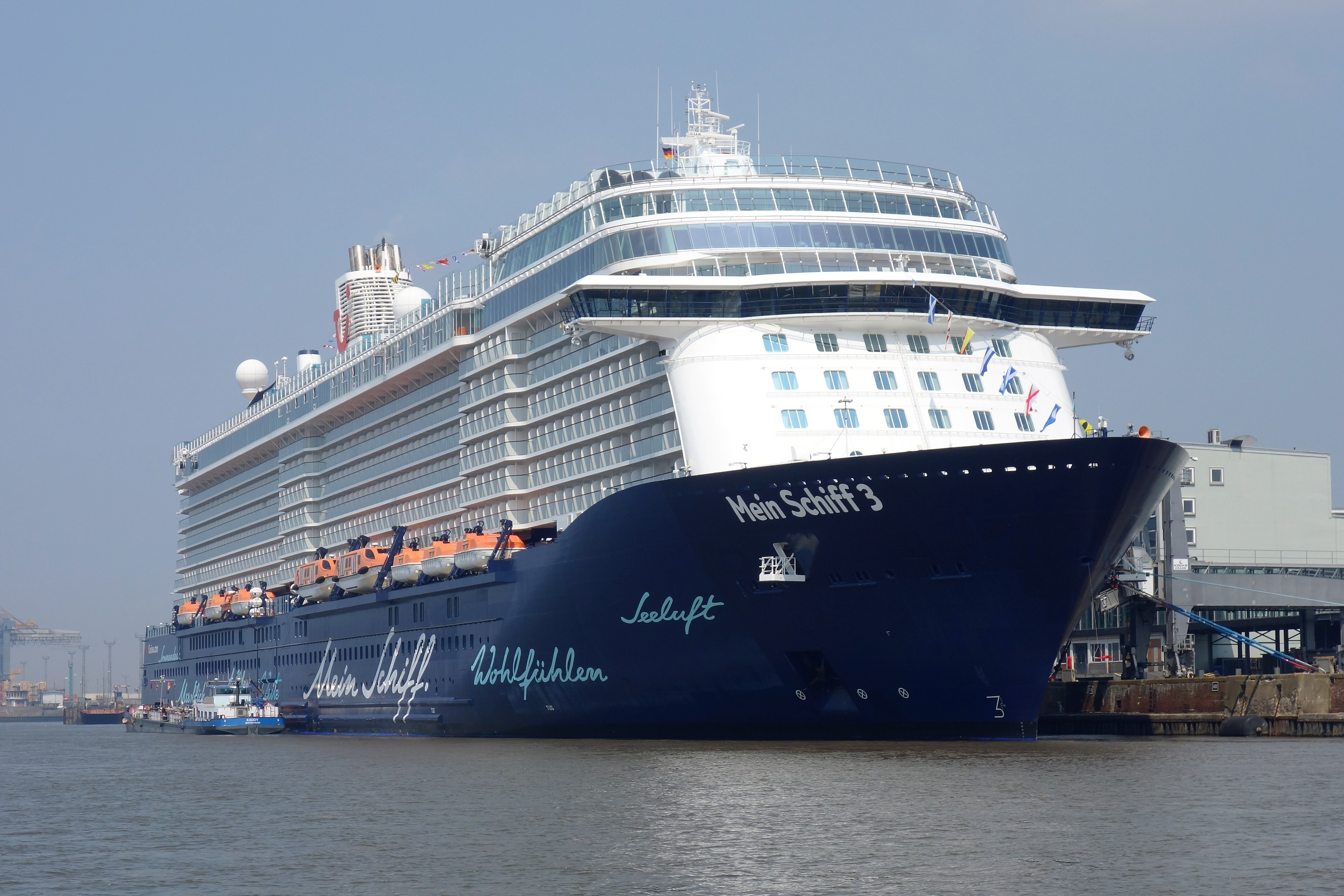

History
- Name: Mein Schiff 3
- Operator: TUI Cruises
- Port of registry: Valletta, Malta
- Ordered: 27 September 2011
- Builder: Turku Shipyard
- Cost: €360 million
- Yard number: 1383
- Laid down: 12 December 2012
- Launched: 8 November 2013
- Completed: 22 May 2014
- Maiden voyage: 13 June 2014
- Identification: Call sign: 9HA3062; IMO number: 9641730; MMSI number: 229090000
- Status: In service

General characteristics
- Type: Cruise ship
- Tonnage: 99,526 GT; 63,078 NT; 7,900 DWT
- Length: 293.2 m (962 ft)
- Beam: 35.8 m (117 ft)
- Draught: 8.05 m (26 ft)
- Installed power: 2 × Wärtsilä 8L46F; 2 × Wärtsilä 12V46
- Propulsion: Diesel-electric; Two shafts; fixed pitch propellers; Three bow thrusters; Two stern thrusters
- Capacity: 1,253 staterooms; 2,500 lower beds
- Crew: 1,000

Mein Schiff 3 (English: 'My Ship 3') is a cruise ship owned by TUI Cruises, and the first custom new build for the cruise line. Built by Turku Shipyard in Turku, Finland, she was delivered from STX Finland on 22 May 2014. She was followed by identical sister ships, Mein Schiff 4 in 2015, Mein Schiff 5 in 2016, and Mein Schiff 6 in 2017. Mein Schiff 1 and Mein Schiff 2 were launched in 2018 and 2019, respectively, followed between 2024 and 2026 by Mein Schiff 7, Mein Schiff Relax and Mein Schiff Flow.

== Design & construction ==
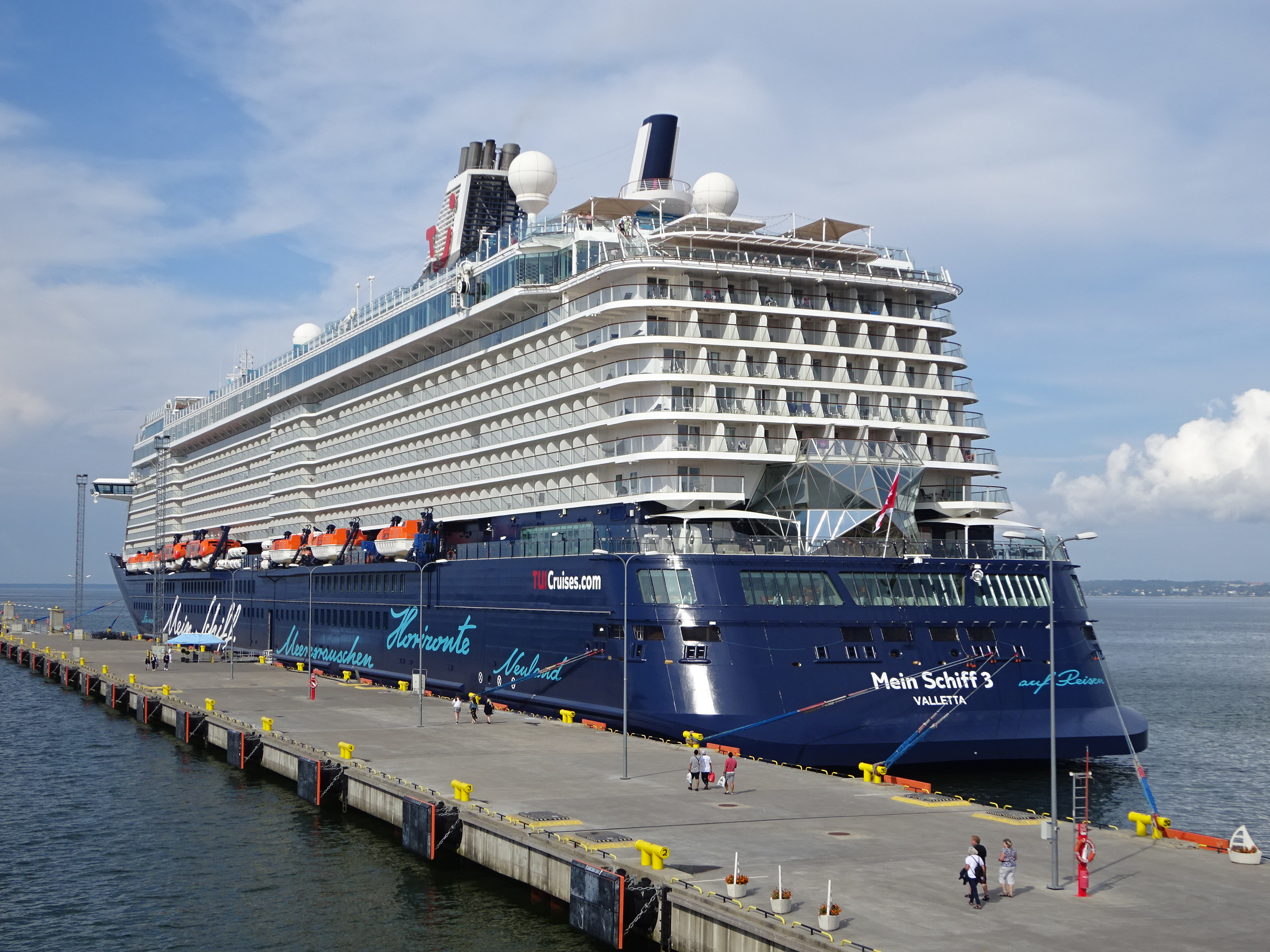
Aft view with iconic Große Freiheit faceted glass lounge and restaurant

On 27 September 2011, TUI Cruises ordered a 97,000 GT cruise ship from STX Finland Turku shipyard with delivery date set in 2014. The cost of the nearly 300-metre (980 ft) was approximately €360 million. The contract also included an option for an identical sister vessel, which was confirmed on 5 November 2012. According to TUI Cruises, the new ships would set a new environmental friendliness standard for the cruise line and feature a number of new technologies to improve the fuel efficiency.

In late 2012, STX Finland was bidding for the construction of the third Oasis-class cruise ship for Royal Caribbean International in Turku shipyard and the funding of the two cruise ships for TUI Cruises was tied to this contract due to the difficult financial situation of the Finnish shipbuilder. However, after the shipyard failed to obtain a €50 million emergency loan from the Finnish Government and the contract for the world's largest cruise ship was awarded to STX France, there was a danger that the Turku shipyard could face bankruptcy unless it could quickly re-negotiate funding for the vessels, the first of which had been laid down on 12 December 2012 under the name "Newbuilding 1383". By February 2013, the financial crisis appeared to be over after STX Finland was awarded €31 million in the form of "innovation aid" from the Finnish Government and the city of Turku purchased the land where the shipyard was located for €23.5 million. The South Korean parent company, STX Offshore & Shipbuilding, would also participate in the funding and the client, TUI Cruises, agreed on more flexible payments. However, due to the looming liquidity crisis of STX Corporation later in the spring, the funding of the newbuildings as well as the future of the whole shipyard seemed again uncertain. The crisis was finally solved when STX Finland sold its shares of Aker Arctic Technology Inc to the state-owned Finnish Industry Investment for €9.3 million in December 2013.

The ship was launched on 8 November 2013 and officially christened Mein Schiff 3, German for "my ship". On 22 April 2014, she left for the first and, due to the tight production schedule, only sea trials. Mein Schiff 3 was handed over to TUI Cruises on 22 May 2014. She will be followed by Mein Schiff 4, delivered in 2015, and slightly modified sisters Mein Schiff 5, delivered in 2016, and Mein Schiff 6, delivered in 2017.

Mein Schiff 3 overall interiors was designed by CM Design, who had previously worked on TUI Hotels; Wilson Butler Architects who designed the open decks, main theater, and the first concert hall at sea on board; Tihany Design, who designed aft of the ship featured the faceted glass structure that enclosed the Große Freiheit lounge and restaurant; and Tillberg Design of Sweden. The open decks features one of the longest pools at sea (25 meters) along with a standard size covered pool aft of it.

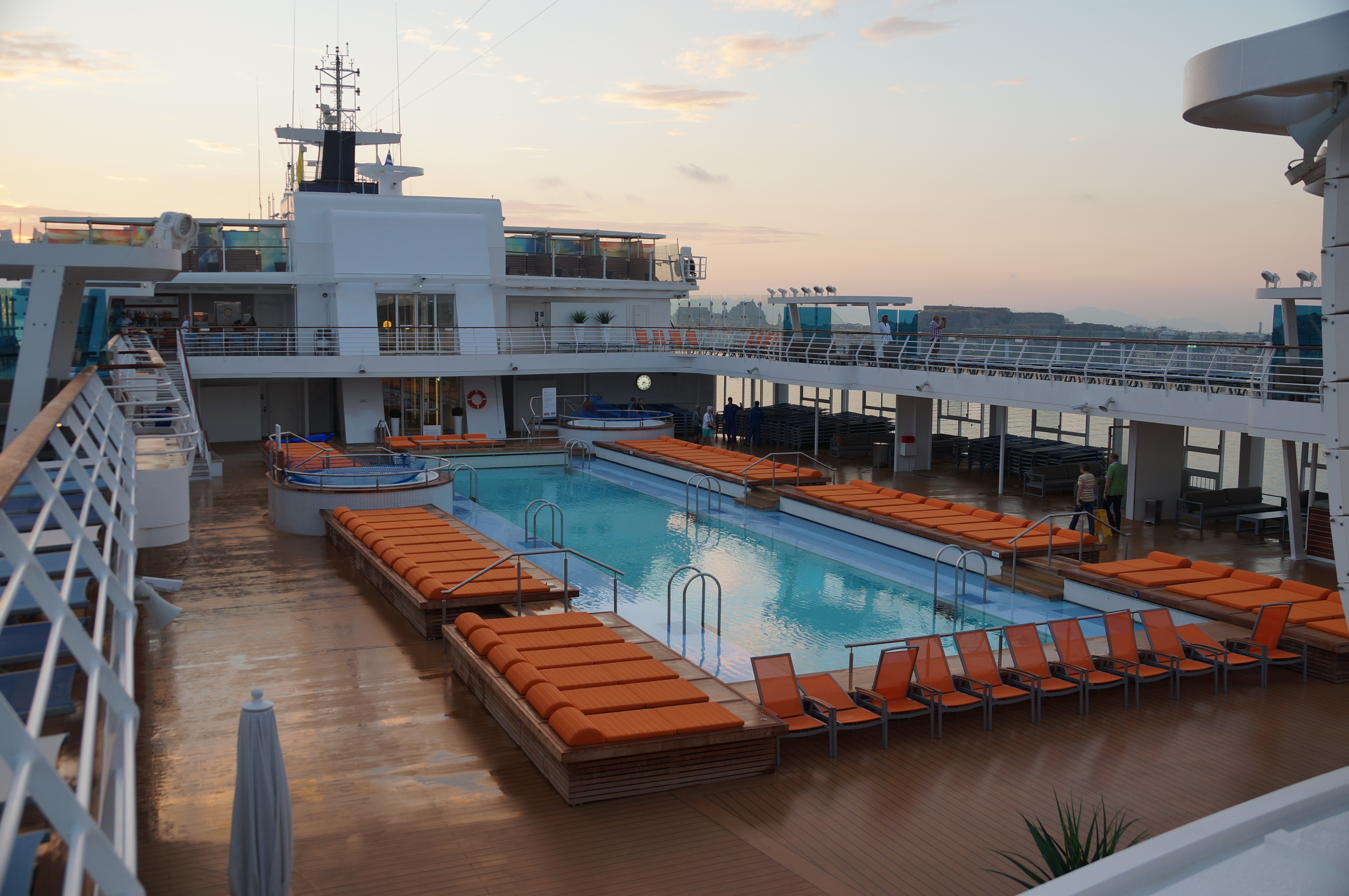
25 meter swimming pool

== Service history ==
Mein Schiff 3 began her maiden voyage from Hamburg to Palma de Mallorca on 13 June 2014. During the summer of 2014, it will operate on the Mediterranean.

On 28 January 2018, Mein Schiff 3 became the first cruise ship to visit Dominica since Hurricane Maria.

On 26 June 2018, the ship suffered damage, while docked in Honningsvåg. Due to strong winds, the ship tore its mooring, and slammed into the docks.

=== Upgrades ===
Between 16 April 2014 until 28 April 2014, Mein Schiff 3 had an additional stern thruster fitted between frames 26 and 33. The work was undertaken in dry-dock in Navantia in Cádiz, Spain over nine days, with finalisation of the works during operational navigation.

== Incidents ==
=== COVID-19 pandemic ===
See also: COVID-19 pandemic on cruise ships

On 1 May 2020, TUI Cruises confirmed that a crew member aboard the ship had tested positive for COVID-19. (Note: The crew member had actually tested positive the day before.) At the time, the ship was located at Cuxhaven, Germany, with no passengers but 2,899 crew members aboard. That number, which is highly unusual for a cruise ship, was a result of the company deciding to transfer crew members from other ships, including Mein Schiff 4 and Mein Schiff 6. Crew members aboard Mein Schiff 3 complained about mismanagement and the difficulty of isolating on such a crowded ship. It has also been pointed out that TUI Cruises' statement contained factual inaccuracies. By 6 May, the entire crew of Mein Schiff 3 had been tested, with 9 tests returning positive.

=== 2026 collision ===
On 25 October 2026, Mein Schiff 3 allided with MSC Victorine and the MSC Anne F, both container ships, while leaving the German port of Bremerhaven. At the time, Bremerhaven was in stormy conditions. The allision damaged some of the ship's lifeboats and hull, as well as the hull of the other two ships, with minor damage reported to a third container ship. Mein Schiff 3 returned to port. As of 27 October, no injuries have been reported.
