= Vapiano =

Restaurant franchise company

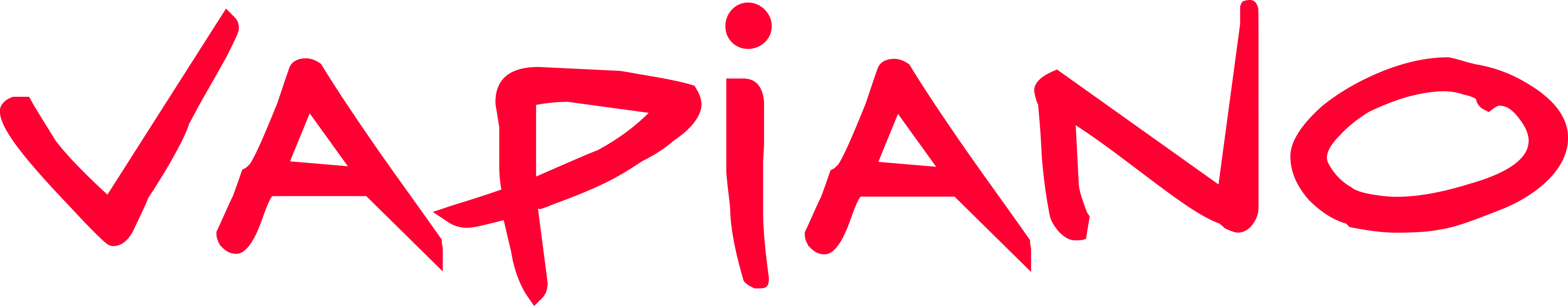
- Type: Societas Europaea
- Industry: Franchise Restaurants
- Founded: 2002; 24 years ago
- Founder: Kent Hahne; Gregor Gerlach; Klaus Rader; Mark Korzilius
- Headquarters: Cologne, North Rhine-Westphalia, Germany
- Key people: Alan Laughlin (CEO); Monika Czyz (COO); Hassan Mechmechani (Development Director); Lukas Linhart (FD)
- Products: Pizza, pasta, salads
- Revenue: 385.9 million EUR (2014)
- Number of employees: approx. 10,000 (2016)
- Website: www.vapiano.com

Vapiano SE is a European restaurant franchise company headquartered in Cologne. The chain's restaurants offer Italian food adhering to the fast-casual principle. Vapiano was established in 2002 in Hamburg. Its largest shareholder since 2011 is the private equity firm, Mayfair Vermögensverwaltung. Roughly one-third of the restaurants are operated by the company itself, but the majority are run as franchise or as joint ventures. In April 2017, Vapiano had 180 locations in 31 countries, including Australia, China, Egypt, and the United States. On 20 March 2020, Vapiano announced its cash-flow insolvency due to a sharp drop in sales after most restaurants had to close due to the COVID-19 pandemic.

== History ==
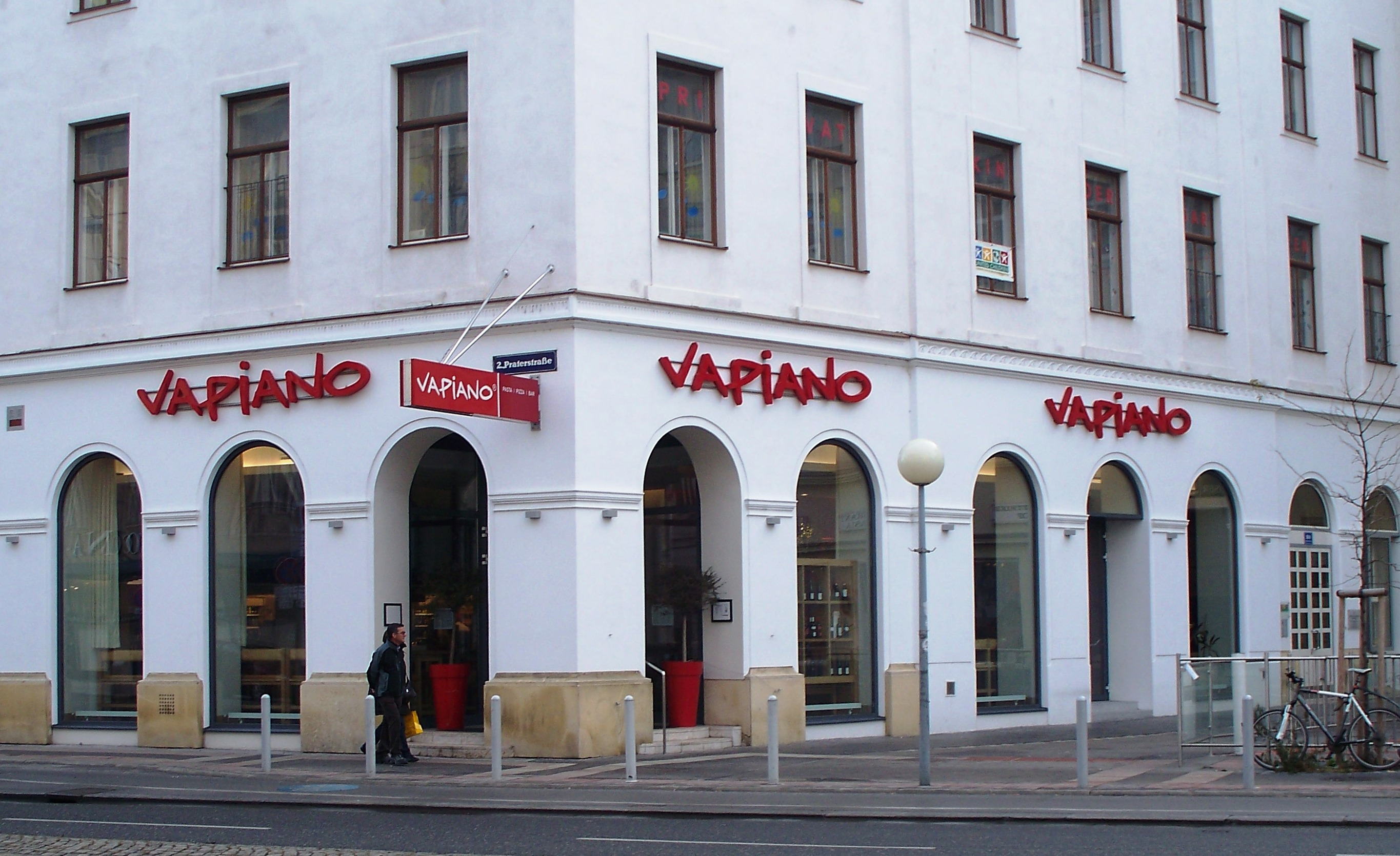
Restaurant in Leopoldstadt, Vienna (2009)

In 2002, Mark Korzilius opened the first restaurant under the Vapiano brand name in Hamburg's Neustadt district. One month later, the company was registered as a joint-stock company according to German law under the company name of Mark's AG in the Commercial Register. In addition to Mark Korzilius, who served as the company's sole management board member, other investors were involved. The Italian architect and designer Matteo Thun contributed to the design. Among other elements, he came up with the interior design of the restaurant. At the end of 2003, the founder Mark Korzilius stepped down from his position as company chairman, and the company was also renamed Vapiano AG. Based on the model of the original Hamburg location, the company opened additional restaurants, e.g. in 2004 in Düsseldorf as well as 2005 in Frankfurt, Nuremberg and Munich. New restaurants were also established in Hamburg.

At the end of 2005, Vapiano moved its headquarters from Hamburg to Bonn. This was in connection with the opening of a restaurant in the Erich-Ollenhauer-Haus. In 2005, the company crossed the EUR 10 million threshold in revenue for the first time. From 2006, the company increasingly expanded abroad, e.g. to Belgium, Austria and Turkey. There was remarkable media reception marking the opening of the first restaurant in Vienna. Activities were also launched in Dubai and the United States. At the same time, Vapiano increasingly began cooperation with franchise partners in Europe. After continuous growth in the years 2006 and 2007, the number of restaurants in 2008 exceeded 30 and by the end of 2009 had already reached roughly 60. In 2011 in Vienna, Vapiano opened its 100th restaurant.

Since September 2008, the company has been operating as Vapiano SE. In 2011, the private equity firm, Vermögensverwaltung Mayfair, acquired 40 percent of the shares in Vapiano from Gregor Gerlach. Gerlach had invested in the company already in the start-up phase, acquired the shares of other shareholders and served as Chairman of the Supervisory Board. The equity position assumed by Mayfair, which according to Capital had even sought a majority, was intended above all to facilitate international growth. The Sander Family, heirs of Wella, had acquired shares in Vapiano in the meantime. The change in the shareholder structure led to the resignation of the longstanding Chairman Marko Silz, due to "differing views" concerning the future strategy. His successor was Gregor Gerlach, who continued to promote international expansion.

After ten years in operation, the company had 118 restaurants and 7,200 employees worldwide, including 50 restaurants and 3,100 employees in Germany. In the 2010s, the company's success led to me-too competitors. In 2014, Vapiano altered its strategy and in smaller cities built new corporate-owned restaurants not run as franchise operations. The growth of the company slowed down, along with basic criticism of the company's expansion strategy in 2015. In mid-2015, Gregor Gerlach announced that he was moving from chairman onto the supervisory board, in order to devote more efforts to other ventures. In addition to the management board, the supervisory board of Vapiano was also newly appointed.

In 2017, Vapiano went public and at that time "had a market value of about 553 million euros, or more than $630 million."

In early 2019 the company was in financial trouble. Losses piled up after sales targets were missed, the share price had slumped by 75% since entering the stock market in 2017, and the company had expanded too quickly. As a result, the company decided to reduce the expansion tempo, have more locations operated by franchisees, alter the concept in order to reduce waiting times for customers and close unprofitable locations. In 2018 the company reported financial losses of €101 million. On 20 March 2020 the company filed for insolvency. The main reason was that losses had increased after almost all restaurants had to close temporarily due to the COVID-19 pandemic.

The company officially entered insolvency proceedings on 2 April 2020 in Cologne.

In June 2020, Vapiano was bought out of insolvency by a group of hospitality investors, led by Mario C. Bauer (former Board member, Vapiano). New investors include Henry McGovern (founder and ex-CEO of AmRest), Sinclair Beecham (Co-founder Pret), Family van der Valk (Vapiano Netherlands and Belgium), and Gregor Gerlach (Founder of Vapiano).

== Group structure ==
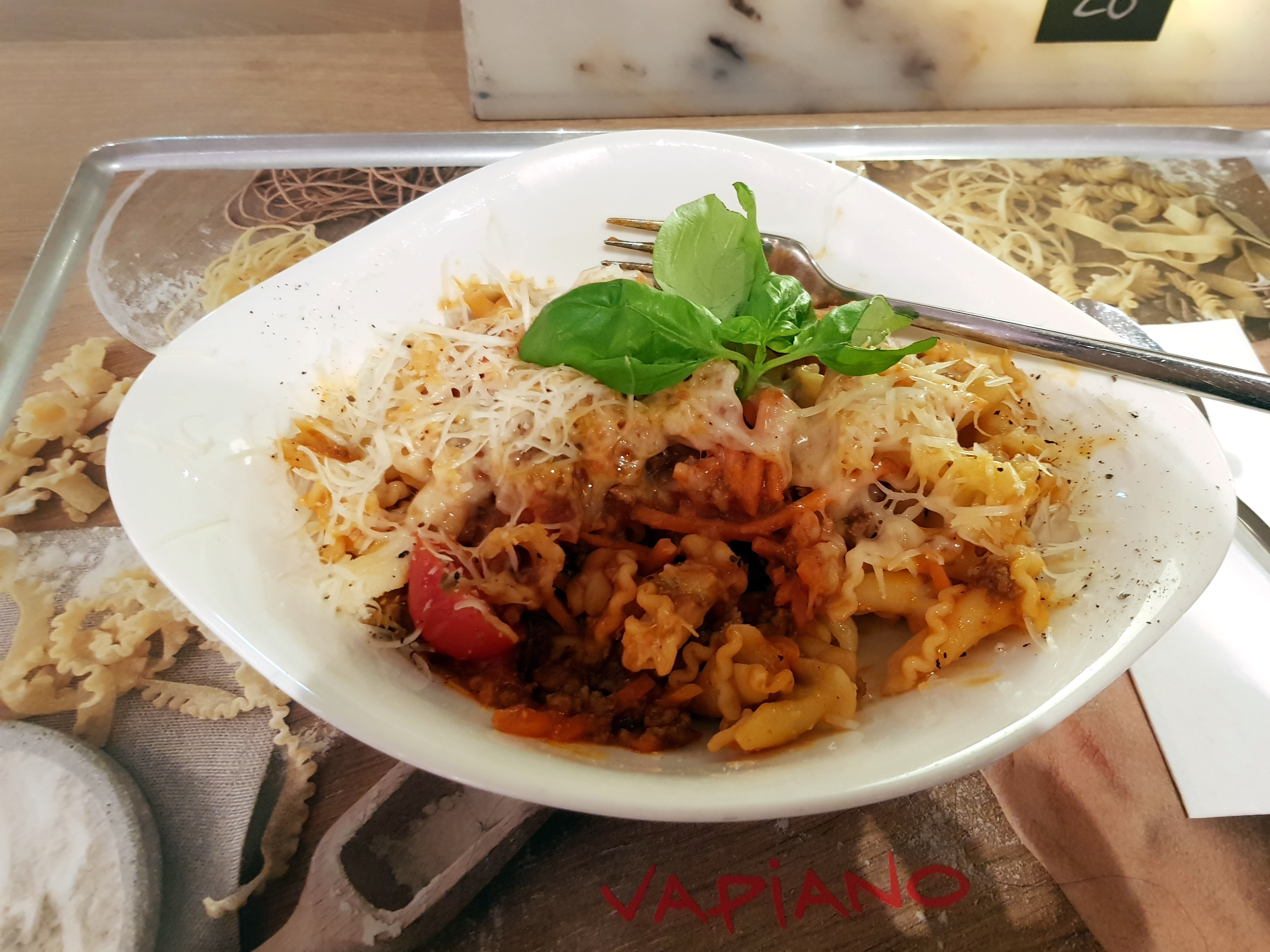
Pasta dish in Vapiano, Berlin

Vapiano SE was the parent company of the group. Since the financial year of 2014, the group prepared consolidated annual financial statements and reported earnings according to the International Financial Reporting Standards. The consolidated companies in 2014 included some three dozen subsidiaries, associated firms and joint ventures based in Germany and abroad, in which Vapiano SE owned at least 50 percent of the shares. This included, for example, Vapiano Ltd., based in London, and Vapiano USA, LLC based in McLean, Virginia. The purpose of the companies included doing business throughout the country or the operation of individual restaurants. The equity ratio of the group was around 34 percent in the financial year of 2014.

Vapiano SE was structured along the lines of a traditional separation of the company's management board and supervisory board. The management board most recently consisted of CEO Alan Laughlin.

== Restaurants ==
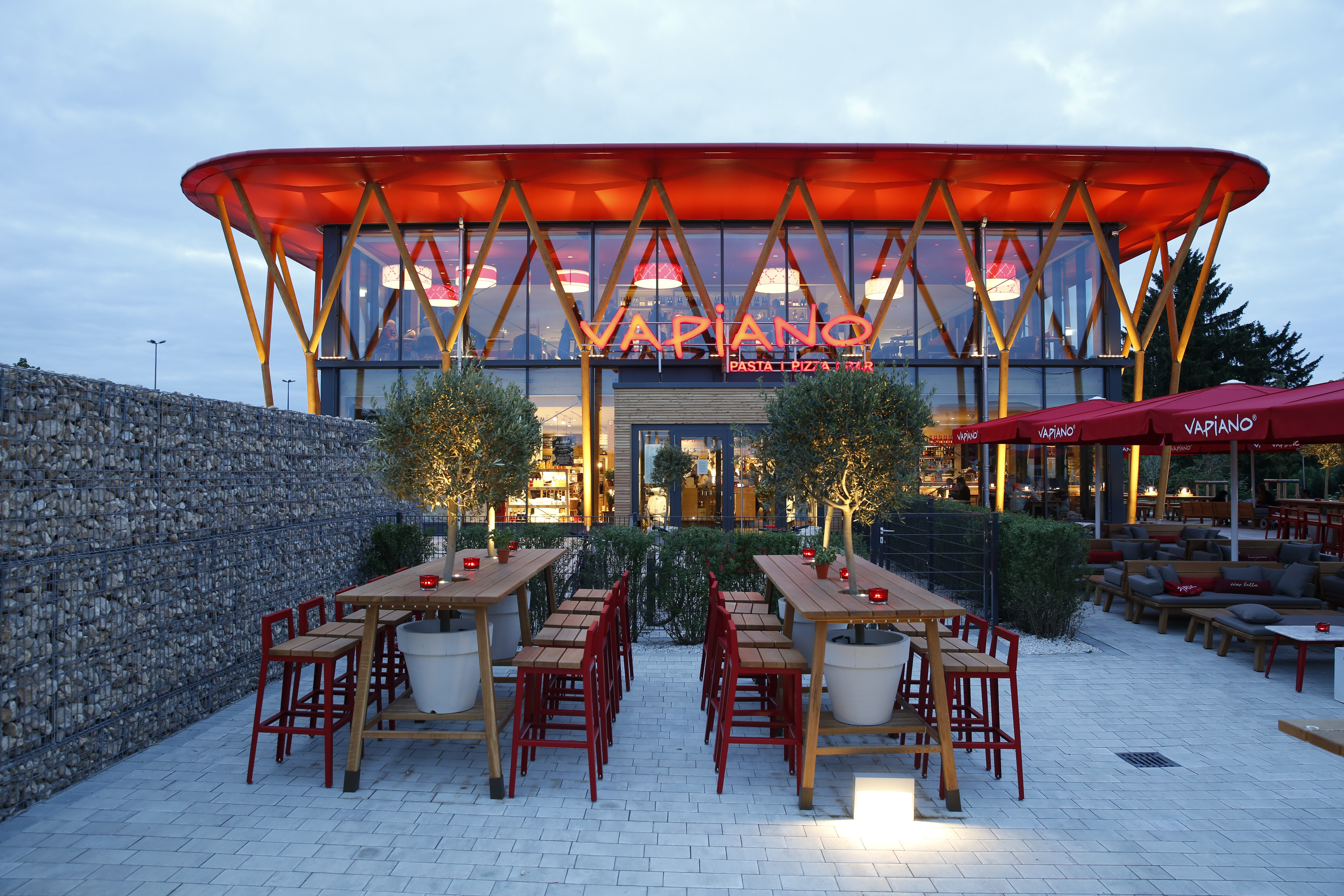
The Vapiano in Fürth is the first free-standing Vapiano (2015).

In 2002, Die Welt (German daily newspaper) described the first Vapiano restaurant as a "cross between a pasta restaurant, pizzeria, lounge and bar in an Italian style". Self-service is an essential element of the Vapiano concept, but the company eschews the term "fast-food restaurant". The name Vapiano is derived from the Italian words va ("go") and piano ("slowly"). The slogan of the company is Chi va piano, va sano e va lontano ("Those who have an easy-going and relaxed approach to life, live more healthily and longer."). Except for bread and rolls, all the ingredients are prepared on site in the restaurants. This applies particularly to pasta and sauces for pasta and pizza. In its restaurants, Vapiano offers various types of pasta, prepared fresh daily.

The chain's restaurants are normally found in central locations or in districts with many offices. Starting in 2014, the first free-standing building for Vapiano was built in Fürth. Restaurants normally have between 25 and 60 employees and range in size up to 1,000 square meters. The company's largest restaurant worldwide, having a floor space of 1,500 square meters, has been operated by Vapiano in Vienna since 2013 in The Mall shopping center in Wien Mitte railway station. With a total of seven locations, there are more restaurants of this chain in Austria's capital than in any other city. The distinguishing features of all the franchise restaurants are a long service counter, exposed-concrete floors, large wooden tables, basket lamps and Italian tile decor, along with a green wall consisting of real plants in the newest Vapianos. In addition, there is always an olive tree and an herb garden with basil and rosemary.

Upon entering a restaurant, guests receive a chip card that keeps track of all the meals and drinks ordered; the guests hand in the chip card and pay for their orders when leaving the venue.

== Locations ==
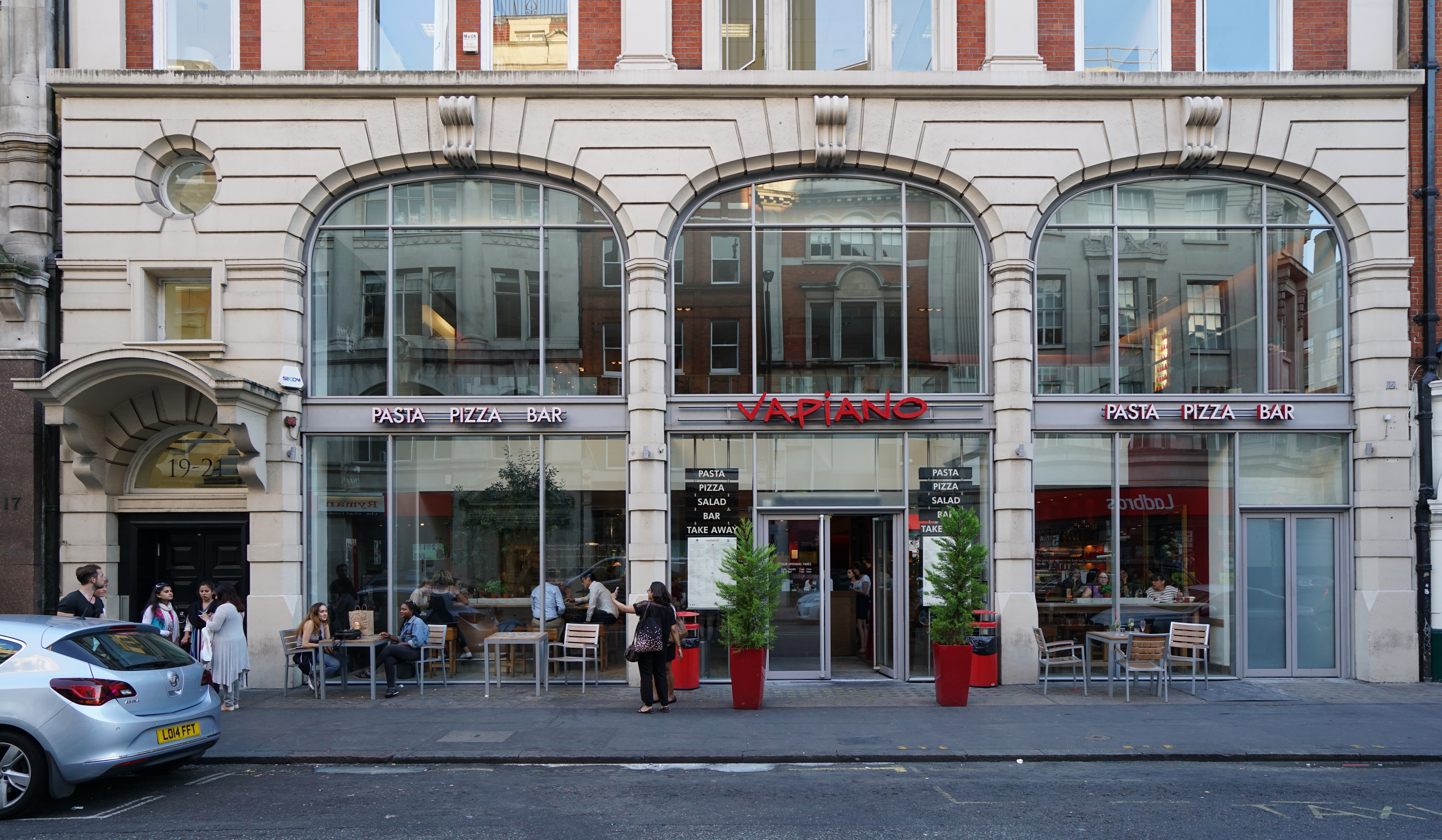
A Vapiano restaurant in Marylebone in the City of Westminster in London. In August 2022, there were six Vapiano restaurants in the United Kingdom: four restaurants were located in London, one in Manchester and one in Edinburgh.

According to the consolidated financial statements for the financial year of 2014, there were 152 restaurants worldwide under the Vapiano brand. According to the company, there were 62 in Germany, 11 in Austria, nine in the United States, eight in Sweden, six in France, six in Switzerland, seven in Australia, five in the Netherlands, four in Hungary, six in England, seven in Mexico, three in the Czech Republic, three in Poland, three in the United Arab Emirates, two in Brazil, two in Denmark, three in Estonia, two in Finland, two in Chile, two in Luxembourg, two in Saudi Arabia, two in Spain, one in Bosnia and Herzegovina, one in Serbia, two in Taiwan, two in Qatar, two in Ukraine, two in Latvia, and one in Kosovo. Vapiano had one restaurant each in Scotland, Azerbaijan, Bahrain, Egypt, Kuwait, Lithuania, Norway, Colombia, and South Korea.

Vapiano closed one of their Luxembourg restaurants after an employee of the restaurant was murdered in a robbery on 16 April 2022. The employee was found dead in the basement, having been strangled, and approximately €3000 was stolen from the safe. Three people were arrested in connection with her murder and as of May 2025, the court case is still ongoing in Luxembourg.

== Criticism ==
Vapiano in Bochum (2015)

In February 2013, the Food, Beverages and Catering Union (Gewerkschaft Nahrung-Genuss-Gaststätten) filed criminal charges with the District Attorney's Office of Bochum, because Vapiano was alleged to have severely obstructed the election of a works council for a Bochum restaurant. Working hours of works council chair members were said to have been reduced, and in addition, they were alleged to have been excluded from further training measures and relieved of responsibilities. Two works council chair members were even said to have been dismissed because the company claimed they had exerted pressure on the workforce. Vapiano issued a statement in this regard that the company had "absolutely nothing against works councils". A short time later, the Allgemeine Hotel- und Gastronomie-Zeitung, the weekly newspaper for the hotel and restaurant business in Germany, reported that the union and the company had approached one another and resumed discussions concerning the election of a works council.

In June 2015, the company was subject to allegations that it had manipulated the records concerning the working hours of its employees, in order to push down wage costs. The German weekly newspaper Welt am Sonntag reported on former restaurant managers who claimed they had been instructed by their superiors to retroactively modify the time sheets of their employees and trainees. This was alleged to be standard practice in several Vapiano's corporate-run restaurants. According to estimates, the losses for employees were said to reach up to EUR 50,000 per year for each restaurant. Vapiano's management board was reportedly shocked by the allegations and spoke of "criminal energy". PricewaterhouseCoopers was hired to investigate the incidents, and the company also announced the introduction of a new system for time accounting.

Also in 2015, Die Welt documented allegations by former employees, according to which best-by dates had been manipulated. "Partly strange-smelling" and "no longer appetizing" meals were said to have been served, also including pasta with a "green shimmer". In order to mask the disgusting odor of some products, employees are said to have been instructed to simply cook the food longer. Vapiano issued an apology for possible mistakes. The company said that, if the allegations were true, it was due to the "misconduct of individual employees". The company said it wanted to look into the allegations and cited its strict quality standards, including inspections by SGS Institut Fresenius and TÜV Rheinland. The Bundesverband der Systemgastronomie, the German federal association for that type of industry, publicly defended Vapiano.
