= Mein Schiff 5 =

Cruise ship built in 2016

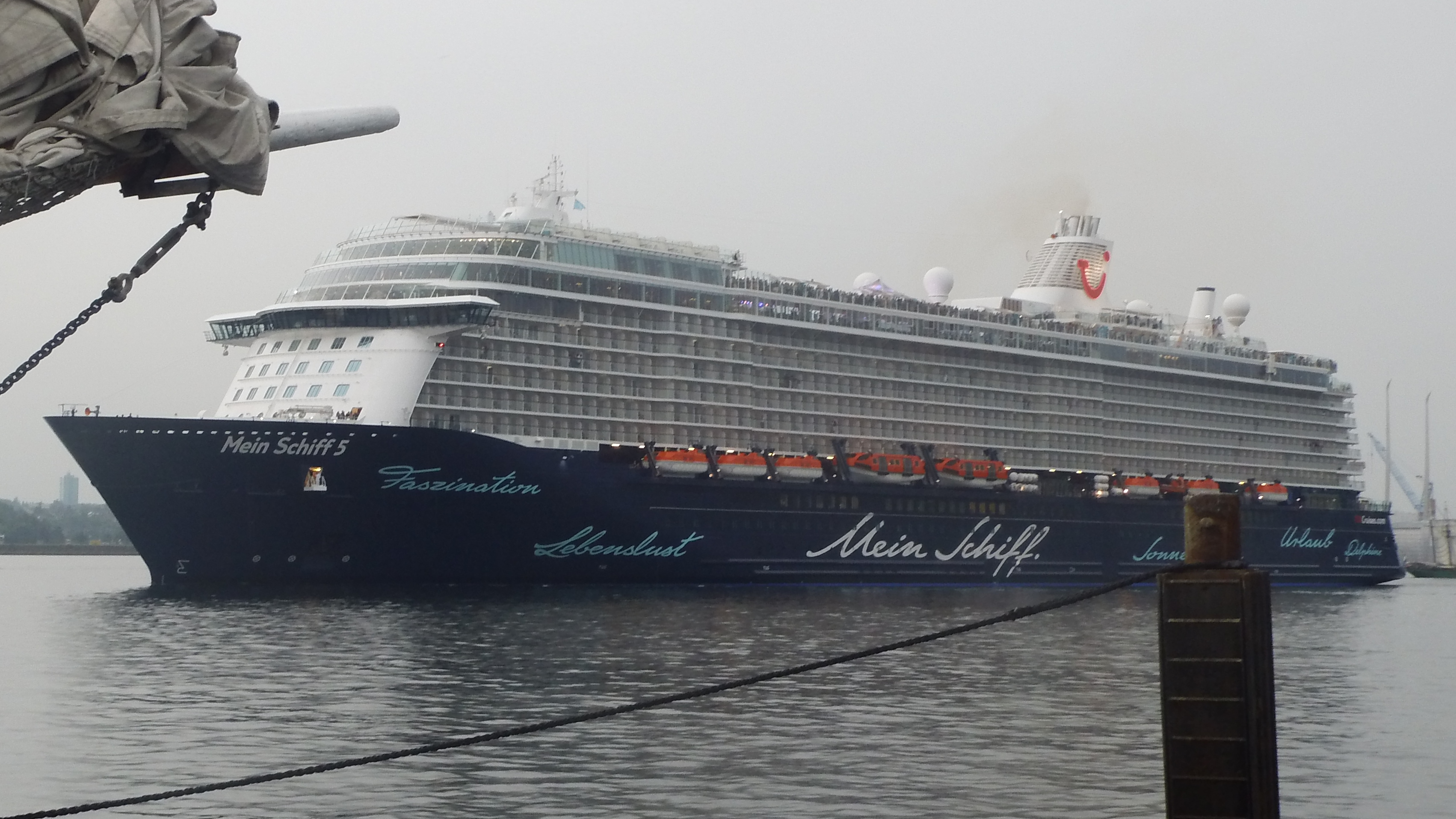
- Mein Schiff 5 in Kiel, 24 June 2016

History
- Name: Mein Schiff 5
- Owner: TUI Cruises
- Operator: TUI Cruises
- Port of registry: Valletta, Malta
- Ordered: 26 August 2014
- Builder: Meyer Turku Shipyard; Turku, Finland
- Laid down: 30 December 2014
- Launched: 15 January 2016
- Christened: 5 June 2015
- Acquired: 20 June 2016
- Maiden voyage: 16 July 2016
- Identification: Call sign: 9HA3858; IMO number: 9753193; MMSI number: 256235000; DNV ID: 34555
- Status: In service

General characteristics
- Type: Cruise ship
- Tonnage: 98,785 GT; 62,689 NT; 7,900 DWT
- Length: 295.26 m (969 ft)
- Beam: 36.24 m (119 ft)
- Draft: 8.05 m (26 ft)
- Installed power: 2 × Wärtsilä 8L46F; 2 × Wärtsilä 12V46
- Propulsion: Diesel-electric; Two shafts; fixed pitch propellers; Three bow thrusters; Two stern thrusters
- Capacity: 2,534 passengers
- Crew: 1,030

Mein Schiff 5 is a cruise ship owned by TUI Cruises.

Mein Schiff 5 is mainly similar to Mein Schiff 3, Mein Schiff 4, and Mein Schiff 6 with only minor differences to its sister vessels.

Upon breakout of the 2026 Iran War, Mein Schiff 5 was stranded in Doha, Qatar. After 47 days, it was able to depart on April 17, traveling through the Straits of Hormuz together with Celestyal Journey, Mein Schiff 4 and MSC Euribia.
