= Germanischer Lloyd =

German ship classification society

Germanischer Lloyd SE
- Company type: Performance-Orientated
- Industry: Shipbuilding, Offshore, Oil & Gas, Wind Energy
- Genre: Classification Society & Consultancy
- Founded: 1867
- Fate: merged with DNV GL in 2013
- Successor: DNV GL
- Headquarters: Brooktorkai 18, Hamburg, Germany
- Area served: Worldwide (77 countries)
- Key people: Executive Board: Erik van der Noordaa, Dr. J. Segatz, P. Paasivaara. COO: T. Schramm. Chief Surveyor: N. Kray
- Services: Classification, Consultancy, Assessment, Research & Software
- Number of employees: >7,500
- Divisions: Americas, Europe-Middle East-Africa, Asia-Pacific
- Website: www.dnv.com

The Germanischer Lloyd SE was a classification society based in Hamburg, Germany. It ceased to exist as an independent entity in September 2013 as a result of its merger with Norway's DNV (Det Norske Veritas) to become DNV GL.

Before the merger, as a technical supervisory organization, Germanischer Lloyd conducted safety surveys on more than 7,000 ships with over 100 million GT. Its technical and engineering services also included the mitigation of risks and assurance of technical compliance for oil, gas, and industrial installations, as well as wind energy parks.

== History ==
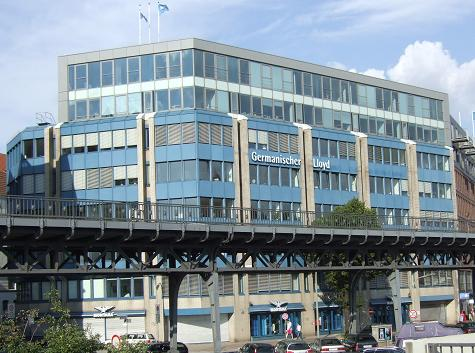
Germanischer Lloyd, former headquarters in Hamburg

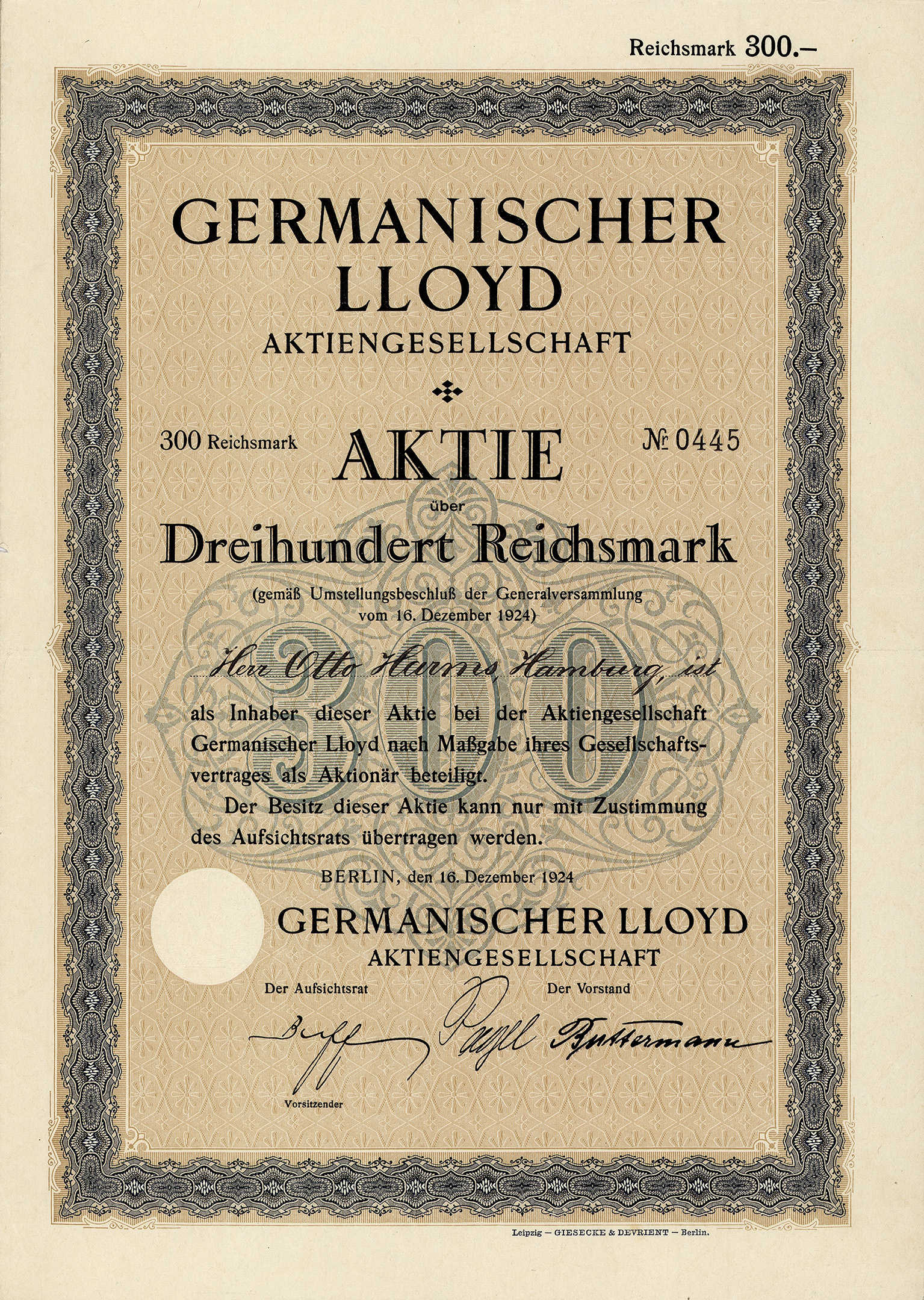
Share of the Germanischer Lloyd AG, issued 16. December 1924

On 16 March 1867, a group of 600 shipowners, shipbuilders and insurers met in the big hall of the Hamburg Stock Exchange on the occasion of the founding convention of Germanischer Lloyd. On behalf of the founding committee, the merchant and shipowner August Behn signed the statute of the young institution. The founding committee consisted of representatives of shipowners J. C. Godeffroy & Sohn, A. J. Schön & Co., A. J. Hertz & Söhne, as well as R. M. Sloman. The new society was founded as a non-profit association based in Hamburg.

The reason for forming a German classification society was to achieve transparency. Merchants, shipowners, and insurers used to get little information about the state of a ship. As an independent classification society, Germanischer Lloyd was created to evaluate the quality of ships and deliver the results to shipowners, merchants, and insurers.

First classifications were based on construction rules developed by Friedrich Schüler, a shipbuilder from Stettin-Grabow, Prussia (later the German Empire). GL's first international ship classification register from 1868 reports 273 classed ships – 26 of them under a foreign flag. In 1877, ten times more classed ships were registered. As a consequence, the surveyor network extended rapidly. By 1869, GL had surveyors in a dozen German seaports and outside Germany in St Petersburg, Copenhagen, London, Liverpool, Amsterdam, Istanbul, Swatow, Amoy, Penang, and Singapore.

Iron and steam ships became more and more popular, slowly replacing wooden sailing vessels. After years of economic difficulties, Imperial Chancellor Bismarck took charge of the situation by announcing a commission. Its advice: The association ought to turn into a public company. The change was finalised at a general assembly which took place on 5 October 1889.

In 1894 as the economic situation improved, Germanischer Lloyd decided to extend its service by teaming up with the German maritime authority See-Berufsgenossenschaft (SeeBG), which was founded in 1887. While the SeeBG issued rules for accident prevention and checked for their compliance, GL provided support as technical adviser. The collaboration between both parties has lasted until today.

As a classification society, Germanischer Lloyd has always focused on ship safety. The importance of the subject became clear with the Titanic disaster in 1912. Two years later, a GL director attended the "Titanic" conference as a representative of the German government. At this point, 10 per cent of the world's merchant fleet was classed by Germanischer Lloyd. The First World War, however, was a severe set-back.

International relationships were discontinued and foreign ships changed class. After the war things started to improve again. By 1939, the register contained 4.7 million GRT (gross register tons). Then the Second World War left its mark: the headquarters was destroyed, offices bombed out, and overseas agencies lost. Most files were abolished or confiscated. The Allied Control Council eventually allowed advocates from the shipping, shipbuilding, and ship insurance industry to obtain a temporary licence for the company; it became permanent in 1948. Following the war, Germany's economic recovery led to rapid development: within seven years the classed tonnage increased from 400,000 to three million GT.

The company continued to grow. Large-capacity computers enabled the design and construction of bigger and more modern ships. Container ships were developed to satisfy the increasing consumer demand for goods. These open vessels were a lot more vulnerable to torsion and a particular challenge for design engineers. GL invested in research resulting in new construction rules for container ships.

At the beginning of the 1970s, offshore technology became an important field of activity for Germanischer Lloyd. In 1973, working on behalf of the German Federal Ministry of Research and Technology, the society surveyed the construction of the research platform North Sea and supervised its installation to the north-west of the German island Helgoland. GL was also involved in the installation of the first German oil production platforms Mittelplate, located in the Wadden Sea, and Schwedeneck, located in the Baltic Sea at the German Bight off Kiel, Germany. Many other offshore technology projects followed and the work continues today.

In 1977, wind energy was introduced as a new business segment. This diversification, originally started in the 1960s, prevented the society from being severely affected by the shipbuilding crisis in the first half of the 1980s.

In the autumn of 2006, French rival Bureau Veritas launched a hostile takeover bid but this was defeated through the support of Hamburg-based entrepreneur Günter Herz. Subsequently, 100% of the shares of the company had been acquired by the Herz family office Mayfair.

=== Status Preceding the Merger ===
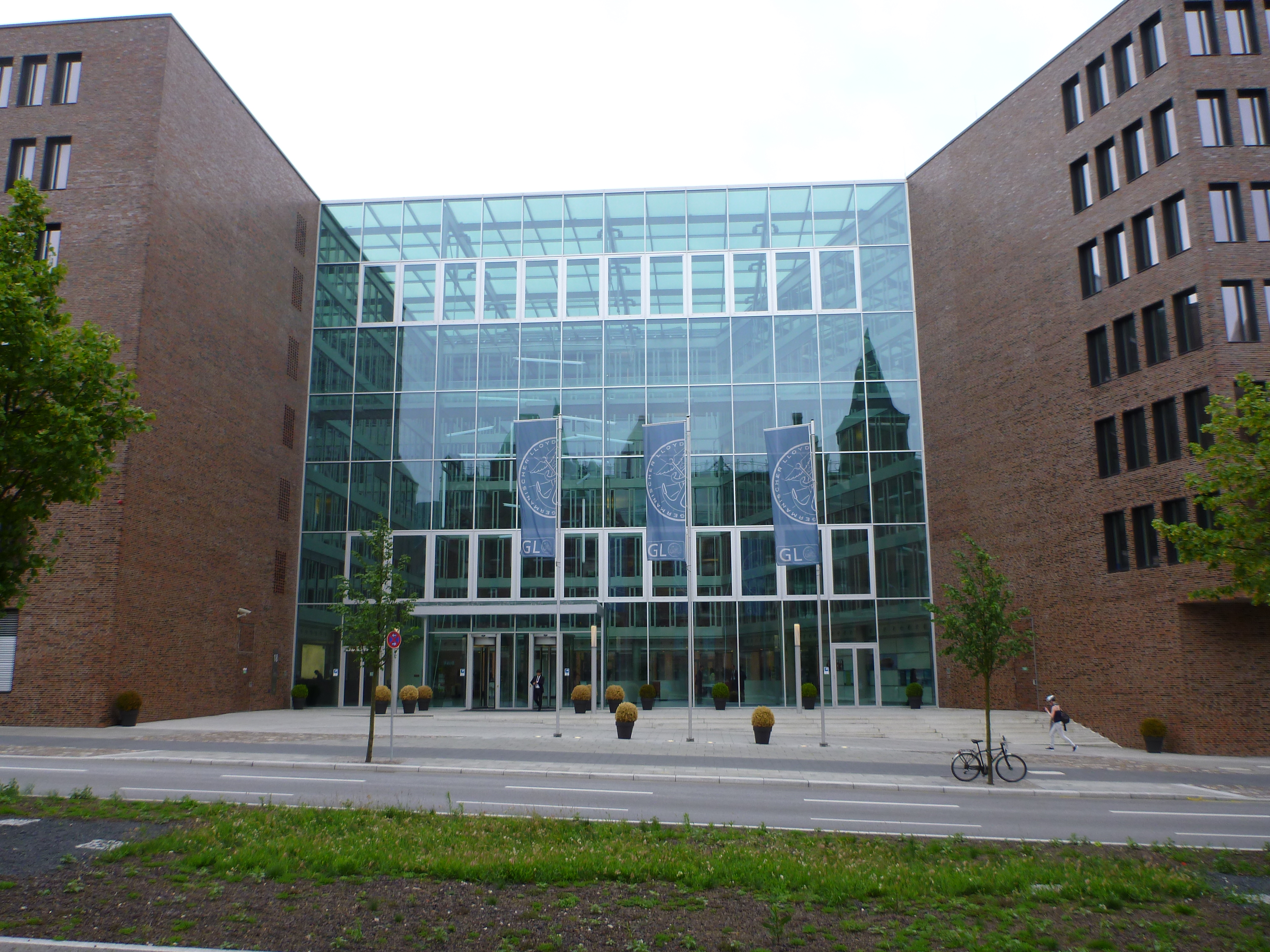
Main entrance of the new headquarter in the HafenCity

Before the merger, Germanischer Lloyd served from a global network of 176 offices in 80 countries, employing some 7,000 people. 124 flag states had authorized GL to perform statutory duties. According to annually published Port State Control statistics, Germanischer Lloyd has been ranking amongst the top classification societies.

After the acquisition of GL by Günter Herz, the group expanded its activities in the energy markets. The acquisitions of Advantica (UK) in 2007 and Trident (Malaysia) in 2008 has broadened the service scope to consultancy services in the oil and gas sectors. The merger with Noble Denton (UK) in 2009 further expanded its activities in offshore technical services and the acquisitions of PVI (Canada) in 2007, MCS (US) in 2008, and IRS (Singapore) in 2009 grew its inspection business.

In the oil & gas business segment Germanischer Lloyd's range of services then covered all major asset types including oil and gas exploration and production assets like rigs, drill ships or FPSOs, storage facilities, subsea technology, LNG terminals, and pipelines, as well as gas, electricity, and water distribution networks. The Group offers certification, inspection, and consulting services as well as software for the installation, operation, and decommissioning phase. Typical projects were owners engineering services, marine warranty services, due diligence studies, risk & safety work, integrity management, flow assurance studies, front end engineering services, or third party certification work. As of 1 January 2010 the oil and gas business operates under the brand GL Noble Denton.

In the renewables segment, GL acquired Helimax (Canada) in 2007, Windtest (Germany) in 2008 and merged with Garrad Hassan (UK) in 2009 making it the world's largest renewable energy consultancy with more than 600 dedicated engineers providing technical consulting services to the onshore and offshore wind, wave, tidal, and solar industries. It is active in 18 countries with major bases in the UK, US, Canada, Germany, Spain, Denmark, Italy, India, and China.

The new renewables business, GL Garrad Hassan, has Andrew Garrad, the cofounder of Garrad Hassan as its president. Its services included wind turbine type certification, design consultancy, energy yield assessments, project management, site assessments, permitting, front end engineering, due diligence, software for wind parks, solar plants and turbine design, wind and solar forecasting, and renewable plant operations improvement services.

== GL Software ==
GL's Software Solutions practice was a global provider of engineering and commercial software and services to oil, gas, petrochemical, water, wind, power, and shipbuilding companies.

Applications were Natural Gas Forecasting, Pipeline Data Integrity, Oil Reservoir Modelling, Gas Mains Replacement, and Regulatory Compliance. Additional solutions include Network Development Services (SynerGEE Gas, SynerGEE Electric, & SynerGEE Water), Pipeline Management Solutions (SPS), and Asset Integrity Systems (GALIOM) which combined AIM and risk-based inspection solutions for any oil, gas, or petrochemical facility or power plant.

In renewable energies the merger with Garrad Hassan provided software set for turbine design (GH Bladed), wind farm design (GH WindFarmer), and a SCADA System (GH SCADA) that can integrate data from all major turbine manufacturers.

The acquisition of Friendship Systems at the beginning of 2009 added the CAE integration platform FRIENDSHIP-Framework to GL's software portfolio. The software could be applied to the design and optimization of ship hulls, propellers, appendages, turbine blades, pump casings, and other types of functional, flow-exposed surfaces.

== Today ==
In September 2013, GL merged with DNV (Det Norske Veritas) to become DNV GL. In March 2021, DNV GL was renamed to DNV. They now form the world's largest ship and offshore classification society.

== See also ==
- Mayfair Vermögensverwaltung
