= Celestyal Journey =

Cruise ship launched in 1994

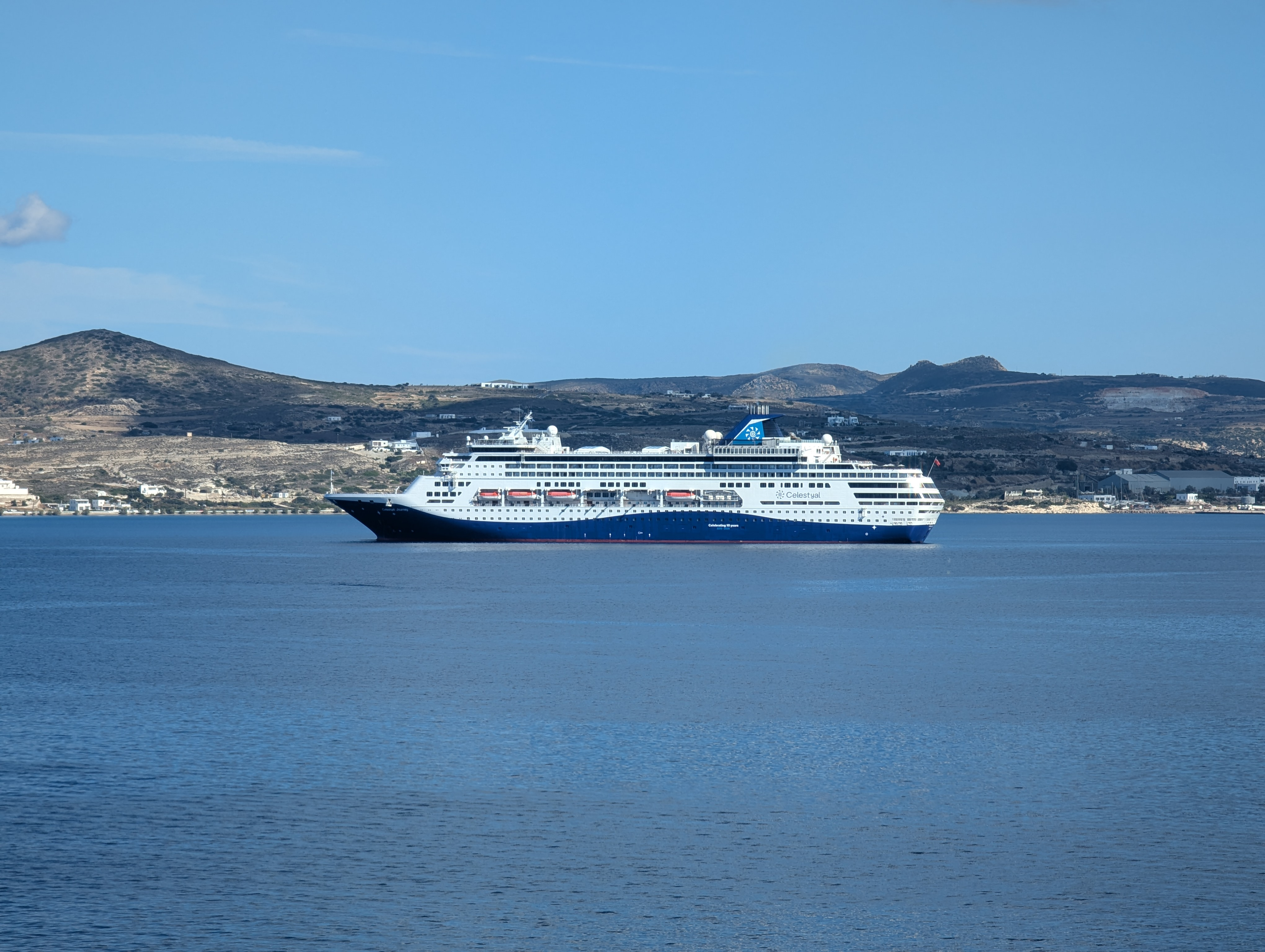
- Celestyal Journey off Milos

History
- Name: Ryndam (1994–2015); Pacific Aria (2015–2020); Ida Pfeiffer (plan abandoned); Aegean Goddess (2020–2023); Celestyal Journey (2023–present)
- Owner: Carnival Corporation (1994–2020); Cruise & Maritime Voyages (plan abandoned); Seajets (2020–2023); Celestyal Cruises (2023–present)
- Operator: Holland America Line (1994–2015); P&O Cruises Australia (2015–2020); Fresco Cruises (plan abandoned); Celestyal Cruises (2023–2024 & since 2025); Phoenix Reisen (charter: 2023–2024)
- Port of registry: Bahamas, Nassau (1994–1996); Netherlands, Rotterdam (1996–2015); UK, London (2015–2020); Bermuda, Hamilton (2020–2023); Malta, Valetta (2024–present)
- Builder: Fincantieri, Monfalcone, Italy
- Yard number: 5883
- Launched: 1 November 1993
- Completed: 9 September 1994
- Maiden voyage: 1994
- In service: 1994
- Identification: Call sign: ZCHB2; IMO number: 8919269; MMSI number: 310811000
- Status: In service

General characteristics
- Class & type: Statendam-class cruise ship
- Tonnage: 55,819 GT; 26,279 NT; 5,709 DWT
- Length: 219.4 m (719 ft 10 in)
- Beam: 30.8 m (101 ft 1 in)
- Draught: 7.71 m (25 ft 4 in)
- Depth: 19.13 m (62 ft 9 in)
- Decks: 13
- Speed: 22 knots (41 km/h; 25 mph)
- Capacity: 1,258 passengers
- Crew: 602

Celestyal Journey is a cruise ship completed in 1994 and initially sailed for Holland America Line as Ryndam. After nine years she was transferred within the Carnival group to P&O Cruises Australia and renamed Pacific Aria. Plans that she would sail for Cruise & Maritime Voyages as Ida Pfeiffer from 2021 were abandoned, and P&O sold her instead in 2020 to Seajets, who laid her up as Aegean Goddess. In 2023 she was resold to Celestyal Cruises and renamed Celestyal Journey. In December 2023, Celestyal Journey was chartered by the German-based cruise line, Phoenix Reisen. The ship was then used for the first section of the company's world voyage (ending at Cape Town), which was originally intended for MS Amera, one of Phoenix Reisen's other ships, which was held up at the shipyard.

== Construction and career ==
=== MS Ryndam ===
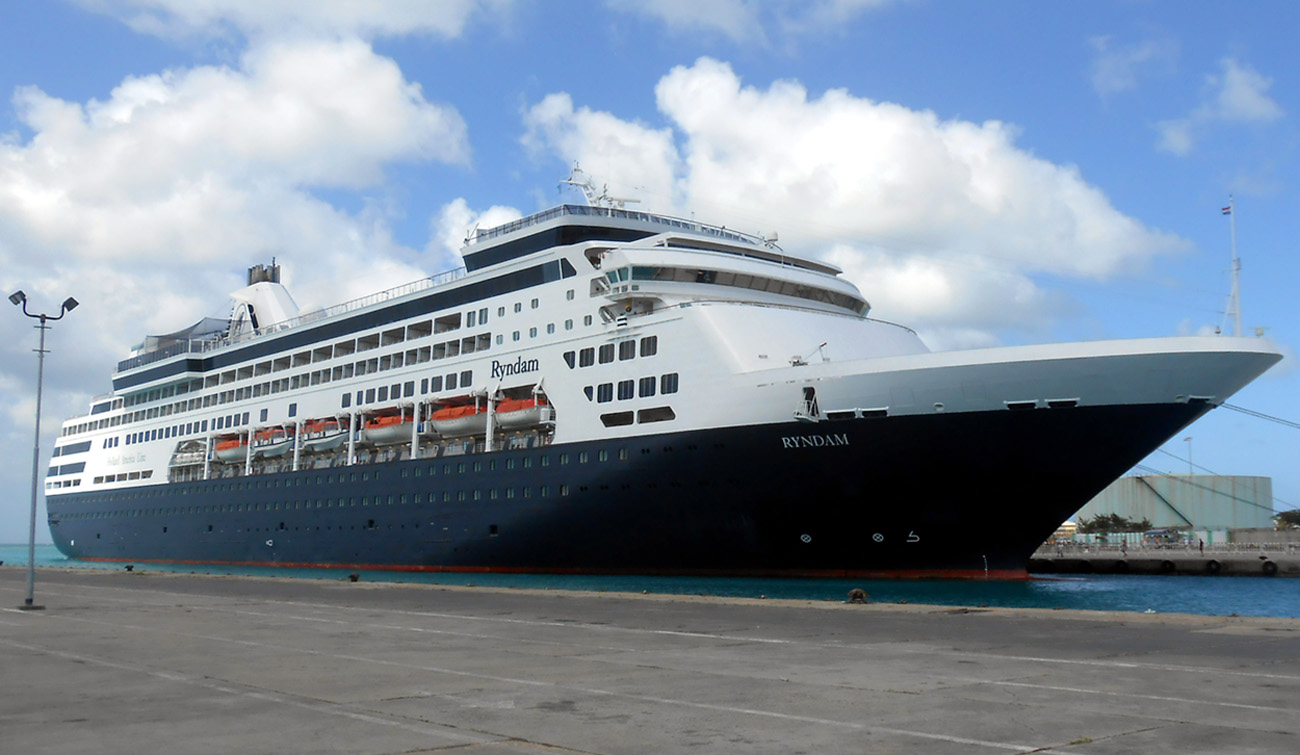
Ryndam at Oranjestad, Aruba

Ryndam was built as Holland America Line's third Statendam class, otherwise known as S-class, cruise ship. She was ordered in November 1989, alongside two sister ships of her class, and was designated hull number 5883. Her keel was laid by Fincantieri in 1993. From 1993 to 1994, the ship was completed and underwent sea trials. In 1994, Ryndam was christened by Madeleine Arison, and made her maiden voyage. In 2006, Ryndam underwent dry dock renovations at Grand Bahama Shipyard in Freeport, Grand Bahama.

From January through March 2007, the cruise ship suffered three outbreaks of norovirus and was forced to return to San Diego, California. 355 passengers and 47 crew became sick on the three voyages. After the third outbreak, the vessel underwent a three-day disinfectant servicing before returning to cruise operations. In February 2008, Ryndam returned to San Diego from a ten-day tour with 113 passengers and 8 crew sicken from norovirus.

In November 2010, an intoxicated passenger released Ryndam's stern anchor while the ship was in international waters en route to Florida, though no damage to the ship was reported. In 2010, Ryndam again underwent dry dock renovations at Grand Bahama Shipyard.

In April 2015, two passengers on board Ryndam were found deceased in their stateroom in what appeared to be a murder-suicide. According to Holland America Line, "The cabin was immediately secured and the authorities, including the FBI, were notified." The formal cause of the deaths remained unclear. Ryndam had to terminate a sailing early due to another outbreak of norovirus in July 2015. She was sailing a 14-day itinerary, which featured ports of call in Iceland and Norway. She underwent a deep clean in the Port of Harwich immediately afterwards, before returning to service.

=== Pacific Aria ===
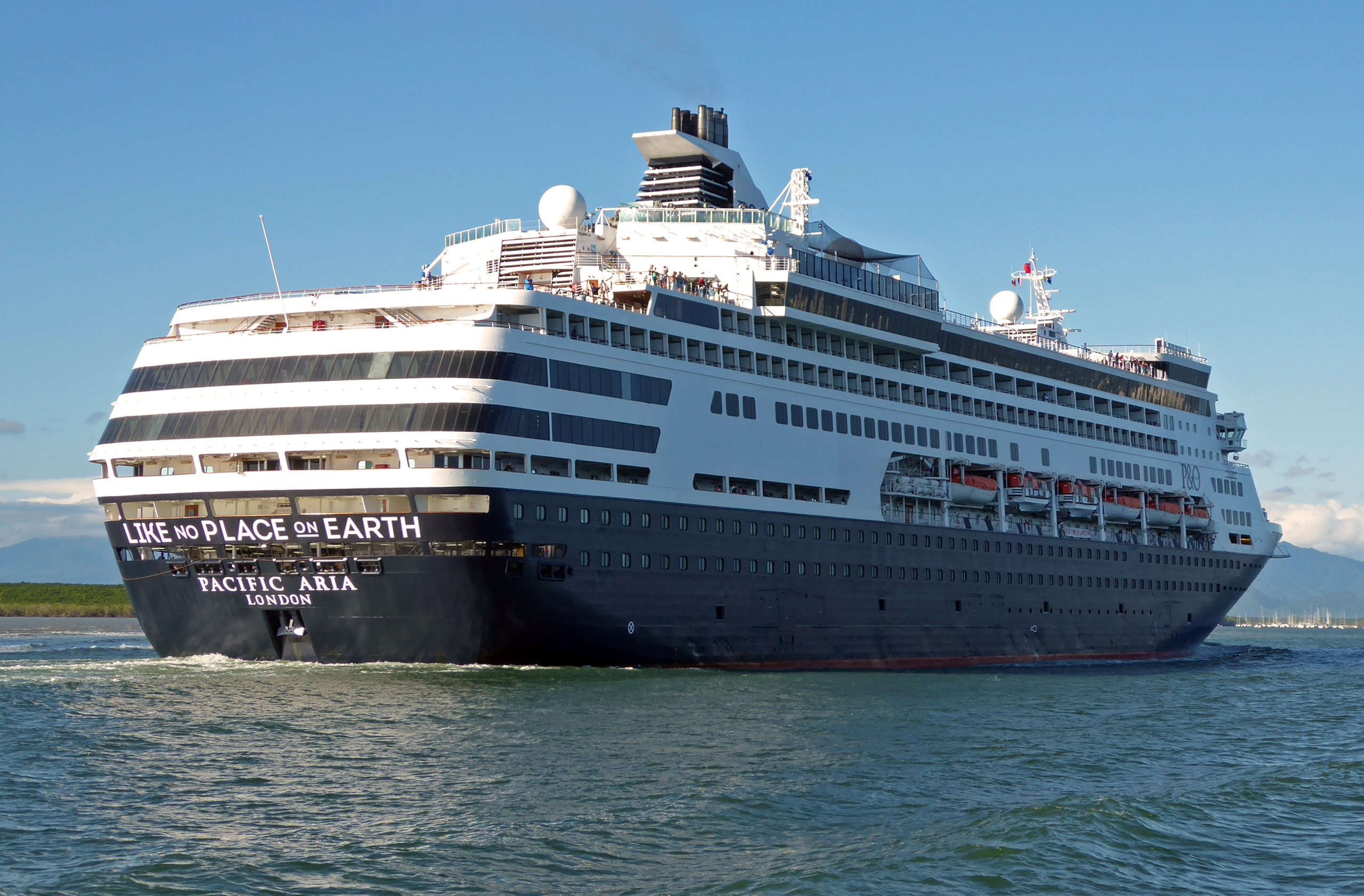
Pacific Aria at Cairns 2016

Holland America Line had announced in May 2014 that Ryndam would be transferred to P&O Cruises Australia after her 2015 season. She subsequently sailed to Singapore for dry docking at Sembcorp Marine Admiralty Yard, commencing 31 October. By 12 November, extensive interior and exterior changes to the ship had been completed, and she emerged as Pacific Aria. In an attempt to garner global social media recognition for the introduction of two new flagships, P&O Cruises Australia broadcast the ships' christening ceremony on Twitter and through their godmothers' social media accounts. Pacific Aria and her sister, Pacific Eden, were renamed in Port Jackson, Sydney, on 25 November, with Jessica Mauboy as godmother for Pacific Aria. Pacific Aria was laid up 2020 due to the COVID-19 pandemic.

=== Ida Pfeiffer and Aegean Goddess ===
In November 2019, it was announced that the ship had been sold to Cruise & Maritime Voyages (CMV) with delivery on 2 May 2021, in Singapore and would be renamed Ida Pfeiffer, in honour of Ida Laura Pfeiffer, a famous Austrian explorer. This would be followed by an extensive renovation, including an increase in berths, as preparation for service with CMV's TransOcean Tours brand. However, on 20 July 2020, CMV was placed in administration and subsequently stopped trading.

In 2020, Pacific Aria was sold to Seajets, and renamed Aegean Goddess. On 12 May 2022, a Greek crewmember was found dead on the ship, laid up at Heraklion.

=== Celestyal Journey ===
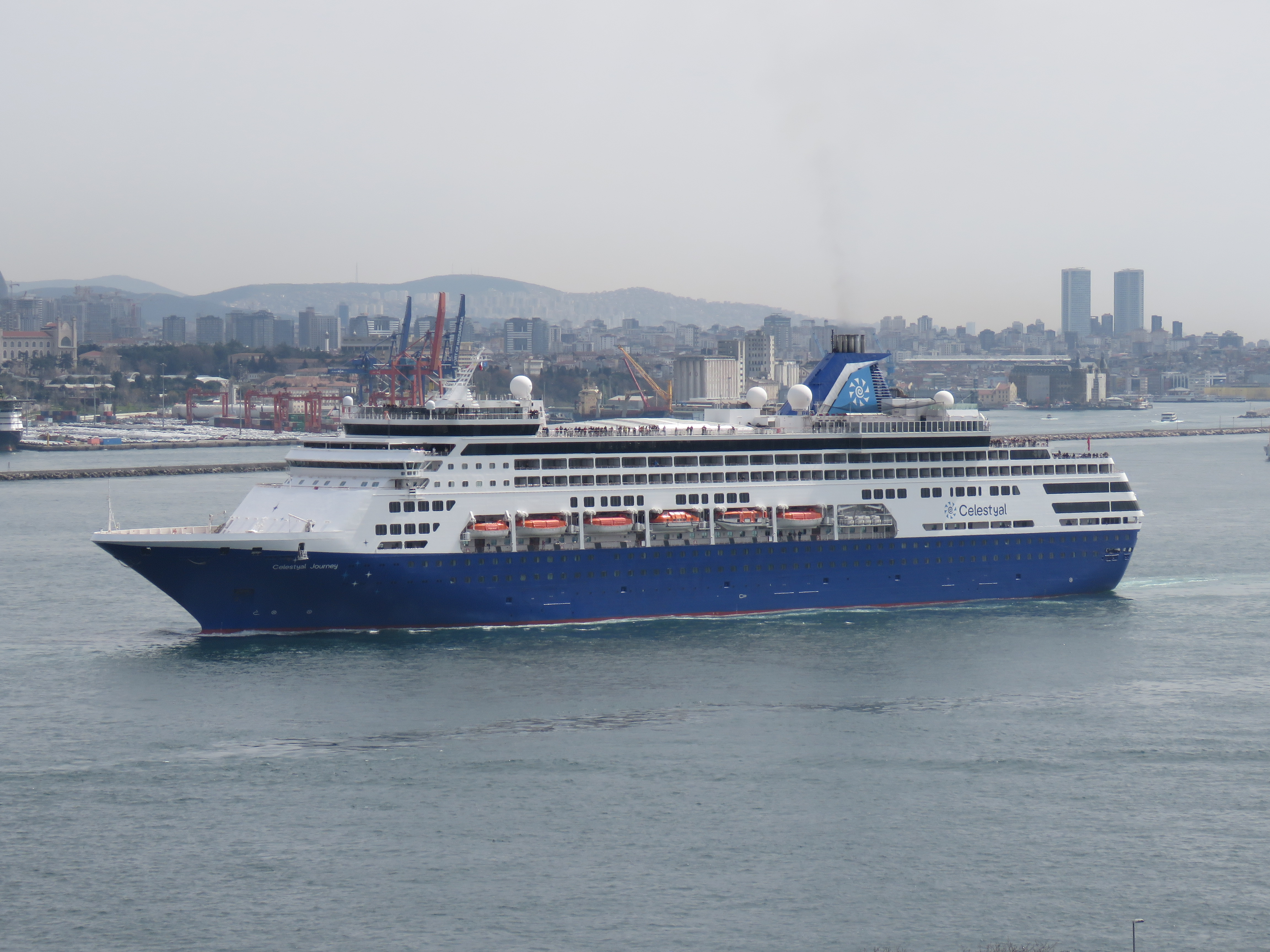
Celestyal Journey entering Istanbul, March 2024

In 2023, the ship was sold to Celestyal Cruises and renamed Celestyal Journey. The ship has undergone an extensive $21 million refurbishment and technical overhaul and is currently in service in the Mediterranean.

=== 2026 Iran war ===
Celestyal Journey along with its sister ship Celestyal Discovery were among the many cruise ships that canceled trips in the Middle East following the joint American—Israeli attack on Iran on 28 February 2026. Celestyal Journey was docked in Doha, Qatar, when hostilities broke out and trips that were scheduled in March were canceled thereby prematurely ending the ship's Arabian winter cruise season.

Celestyal Journey departed from Doha on April 17, traveling through the Straits of Hormuz together with Mein Schiff 4, Mein Schiff 5 and MSC Euribia.
