= MSC Euribia =

Cruise ship

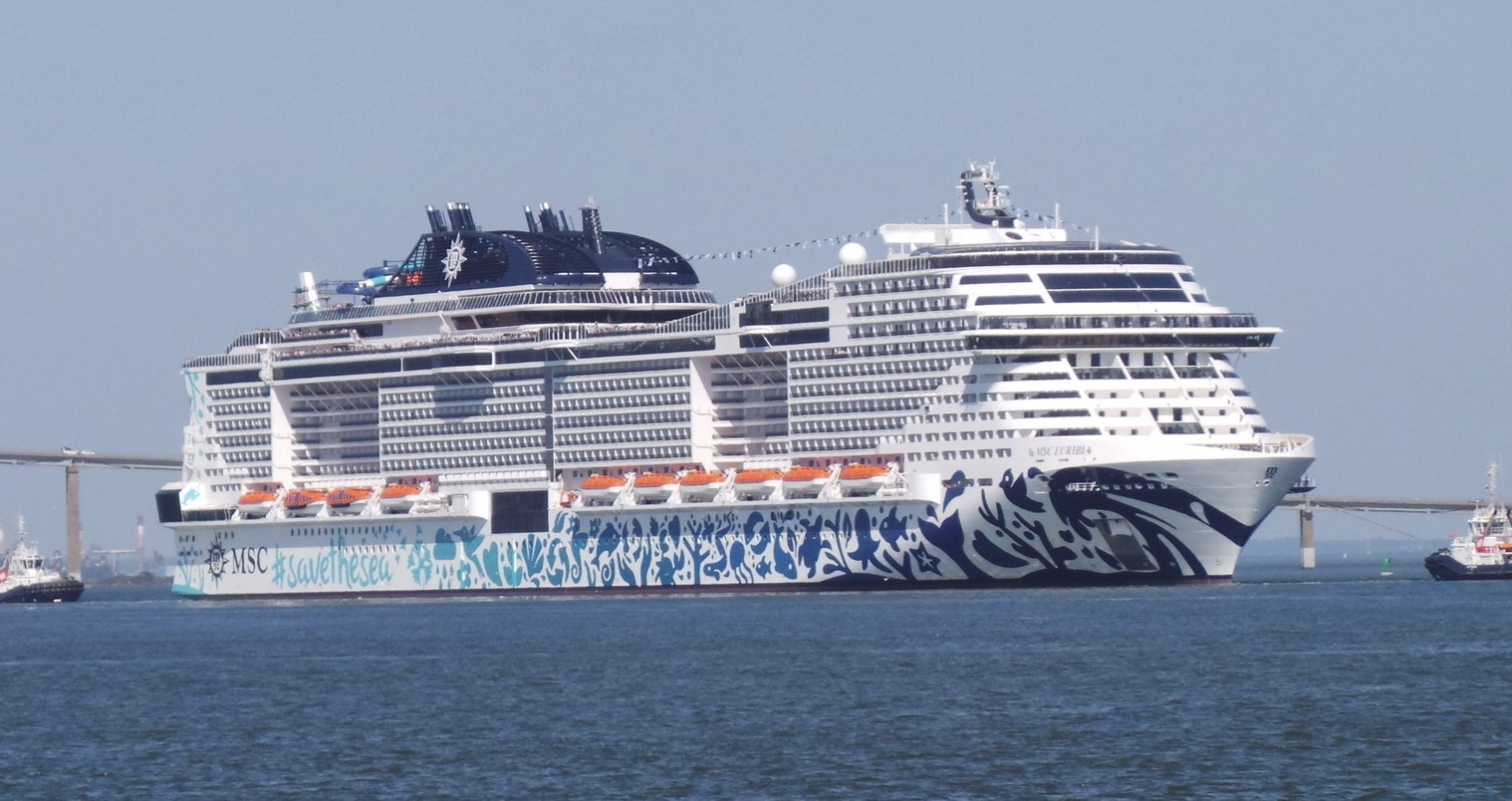
- MSC Euribia near Saint-Nazaire in 2023

History
- Name: MSC Euribia
- Owner: MSC Cruises
- Operator: MSC Cruises
- Port of registry: Valletta, Malta
- Builder: Chantiers de l'Atlantique
- Yard number: V34
- Laid down: 28 June 2021
- Launched: 22 June 2022
- Sponsored by: Sophia Loren
- Christened: 8 June 2023
- Acquired: 31 May 2023
- In service: 2023–present
- Identification: Call sign: 9HA5782; IMO number: 9901544; MMSI number: 256281000

General characteristics
- Class & type: Meraviglia Plus-class cruise ship
- Tonnage: 184,011 GT
- Length: 331 m (1,085 ft 11 in)
- Beam: 43 m (141 ft 1 in)
- Height: 65 m (213 ft 3 in)
- Decks: 16
- Speed: 22.3 knots (41.3 km/h; 25.7 mph)
- Capacity: 6,327
- Crew: 1,711

MSC Euribia is a Meraviglia-Plus-class cruise ship owned and operated by MSC Cruises. She was launched on 22 June 2022, followed by sea trials, and entered service in June 2023.

== History ==
Built by Chantiers de l'Atlantique in Saint-Nazaire, France, MSC Euribia is the third ship in the Meraviglia-Plus class. MSC placed the order for the ship in 2018, with construction beginning in June 2020 and keel laying in December 2021.

She was launched on 22 June 2022, followed by sea trials. She was delivered to MSC Cruises on 31 May 2023 and entered service in June 2023.

== Description ==
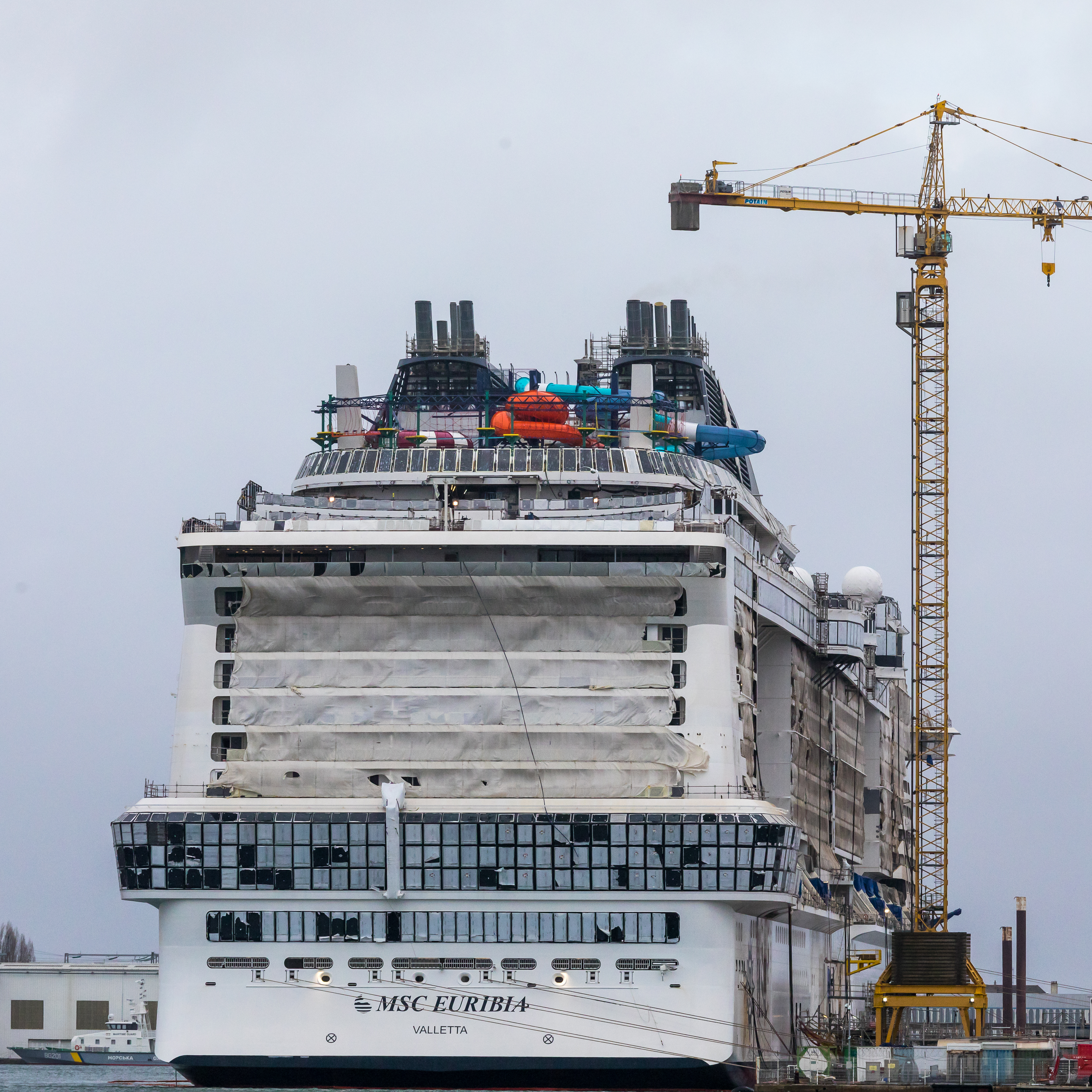
MSC Euribia at the Chantiers de l'Atlantique shipyard, Bassin de Penhoë, Port de Saint-Nazaire

MSC Euribia is the 22nd ship operated by the Geneva-based Italian shipping company MSC Cruises. It is the fifth unit of the Meraviglia class built by Chantiers de l'Atlantique for MSC Cruises.

The ship is the second MSC ship to be powered by LNG, resulting in reduced greenhouse gas emissions.

MSC Euribia measures around 180,000 gross tonnage (GT). During sea trials, it achieved a top speed of 23.5 knots (43.5 km/h; 27.0 mph). The ship, designated as Yard No. V34, is 331.4 metres (1,087 ft 3 in) long, 43 metres (141 ft 1 in) wide, and has a depth of 8.5 metres (27 ft 11 in). It is 65 m (213 ft 3 in) in height.

The ship can carry 6,327 passengers and 1,711 crew.

== 2026 Iran war ==
In March 2026, MSC Euribia was one of six cruise ships stuck in the Gulf during the 2026 Iran war, when Iran closed the Straits of Hormuz. MSC arranged chartered flights with Emirates Airlines to get some of the stranded passengers home from Dubai.

On April 17, MSC Euribia departed from Dubai, along with the Celestyal Journey, hours after Celestyal Discovery departed. Both ships travelled through the Straits of Hormuz, in a group together with Mein Schiff 4 and Mein Schiff 5 which had been stranded in Doha. Crew from one of the ships reported a “splash” occurred near the ship while transiting the Strait, while another containership was struck by a projectile. The cruise ships departed while the Strait was reportedly open, but then Iran declared the Strait closed. MSC reports that the MSC Euribia was able to safely pass through the Strait, and is returning to Europe.
