= Mein Schiff 4 =

Ship built in 2015

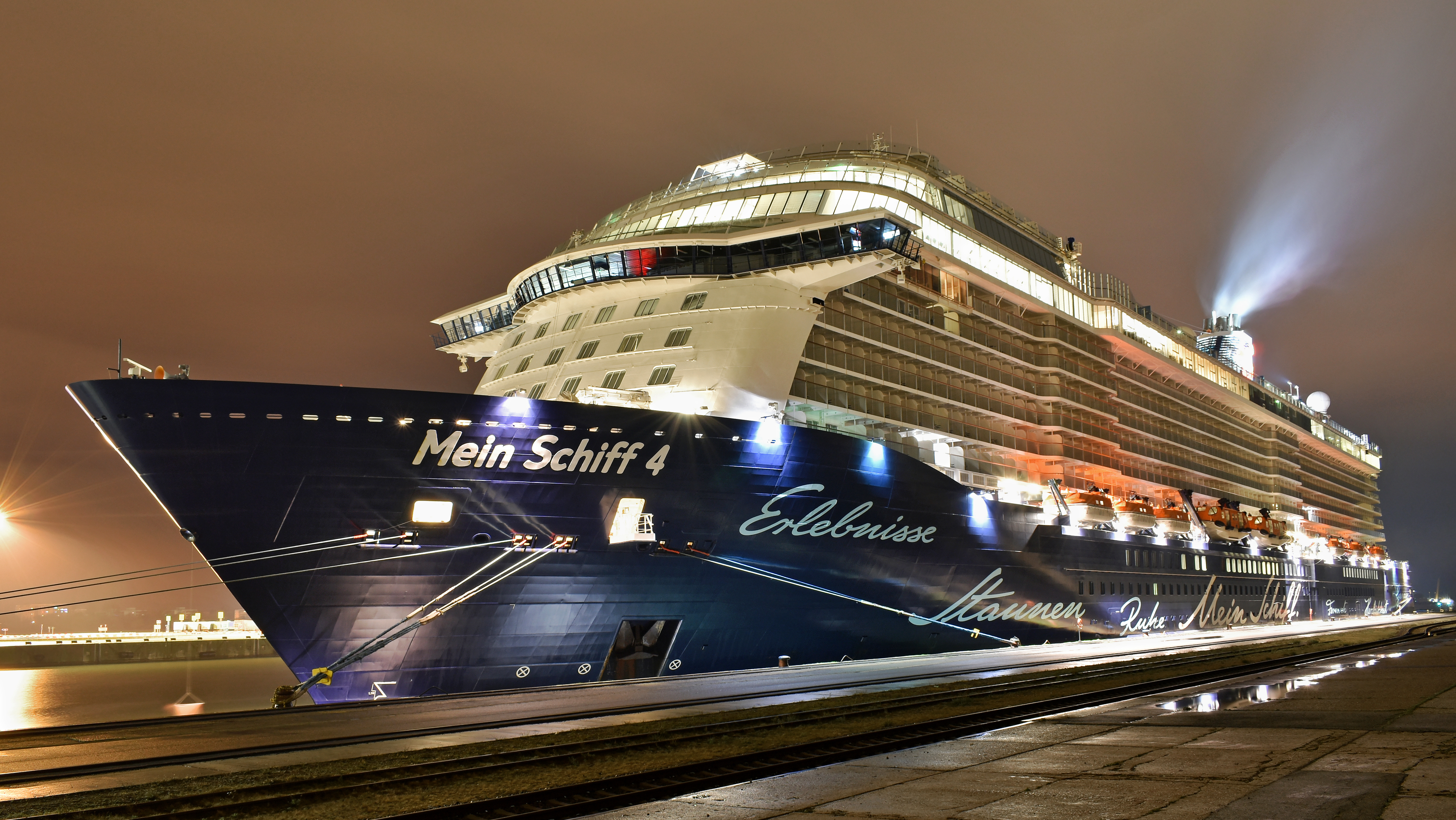
- Mein Schiff 4 in Rostock, 2021

History
- Name: Mein Schiff 4
- Operator: TUI Cruises
- Port of registry: Valletta, Malta
- Ordered: 27 September 2011
- Builder: Meyer Turku Shipyard; Turku, Finland
- Yard number: 1384
- Laid down: 6 April 2013
- Launched: 10 October 2014
- Sponsored by: Franziska van Almsick
- Christened: 5 June 2015
- Completed: 8 May 2015
- Maiden voyage: 6 June 2015
- Identification: Call sign: 9HA3513; IMO number: 9678408; MMSI number: 229678000; DNV ID: 33031
- Status: In service

General characteristics
- Type: Cruise ship
- Tonnage: 99,526 GT; 63,078 NT; 7,900 DWT
- Length: 293.2 m (962 ft)
- Beam: 42.3 m (139 ft)
- Draught: 8.27 m (27 ft)
- Installed power: 2 × Wärtsilä 8L46F; 2 × Wärtsilä 12V46
- Propulsion: Diesel-electric; two shafts with fixed pitch propellers; Three bow thrusters; Two stern thrusters
- Capacity: 2,506 passengers
- Crew: 1,030

Mein Schiff 4 is a cruise ship owned by TUI Cruises. Built by Meyer Turku Shipyard in Turku, Finland, she was floated out on 10 October 2014, delivered to TUI Cruises on 8 May 2015, and christened by former Olympic swimmer Franziska van Almsick in Kiel, Germany, on 5 June 2015.

For the most part, Mein Schiff 4 is a copy of her sister ship, Mein Schiff 3.

== Service history ==
On 14 May 2015, Mein Schiff 4 entered her first port, Kiel, from where she was scheduled to operate a series of short inaugural cruises. She returned to Kiel on 5 June 2015.

That afternoon and evening, TUI Cruises held a ceremony at Kiel's Ostseekai cruise terminal, to celebrate the ship's entry into service. Around 1,000 guests were present inside Mein Schiff 4's theatre; an estimated 25,000 spectators watched the event from outside. At 9 pm, following performances by a number of singers, the ship's sponsor, Franziska van Almsick, was raised above the foreship, wearing a 15 m (49 ft)-long christening robe weighing 300 kg (660 lb) and with a diameter of 20 m (66 ft). Van Almsick then christened Mein Schiff 4, by smashing a bottle of Pommery champagne against the ship's side. The ceremony later concluded with a late-night fireworks display, accompanied by an electro and house set from DJ Tanja La Croix.

The following day, 6 June 2015, Mein Schiff 4 departed from Kiel on her maiden voyage, to the eastern Baltic. She was home ported in Kiel for the 2015 summer season, and operate seven-day voyages to the Canary Islands, Morocco and Madeira during the winter.

=== 2026 Iran War ===
Upon breakout of the 2026 Iran War, Mein Schiff 4 was stranded in Doha, Qatar. After 47 days, it was able to depart on April 17, traveling through the Straits of Hormuz together with Celestyal Journey, Mein Schiff 5 and MSC Euribia. Crew from one of the ships reported a “splash” occurred near the ship while transiting the Strait, while another containership in the Strait was struck by a projectile. The cruise ships departed while the Strait was reportedly open, but then Iran declared the Strait closed in response to the United States blockade.
