= Mayfair Vermögensverwaltung =

Financial services company

Mayfair Vermögensverwaltung SE
- Type: Societas Europaea
- Industry: Family Office
- Headquarters: Hamburg, Germany (Global)
- Products: Investments, Private Equity

Mayfair Vermögensverwaltung SE is the family office of the families of Günter Herz and Daniela Herz. It invests in long term holdings of companies, short term assets like stocks and bonds, and real estate.

The long-term investment area is run by Maryland GmbH. According to German press quotes, investments range from € 100m to several billion per transaction and have an emphasis on companies from the consumer goods, retail or service sectors.

== History of the families ==
The families had been long term shareholders of Tchibo Group. Günter Herz took over the leadership of the group from his father in 1965. Since then Tchibo expanded from some DM 50m turnover to almost €9.5bn on a pro forma consolidated basis.

Tchibo Frischröst GmbH, the original coffee business innovated a non-food concept with weekly changing assortments that it introduced in its 1300 store retail chain. It also expanded through an innovative concession depot concept to some 25,000 point of sale in Germany, Austria and Switzerland growing its total business to some €3.9bn turnover in 2003. In 1997 Tchibo acquired its key competitor Eduscho, integrated the logistics and retail operations and included the Eduscho coffee brand in its coffee portfolio.

In 1977 Tchibo bought a 25% stake in publicly listed Beiersdorf AG. At the time Beiersdorf achieved a turnover of some € 400m from its Nivea, Tesa and Hansaplast brands. During the 80s Nivea was repositioned from a cream brand to a personal care brand and started on a global expansion. 25 years later Nivea has become the largest personal care brand globally and Beiersdorf has grown to almost € 5bn in sales.

Finally in 1980 the group acquired a stake in the European cigarette company Reemtsma. That stake was increased over the years to a 76% holding and Reemtsma turnover grew from €1.5bn in 1980 to €8.5bn in 2002. 21 years after the first investment, Tchibo decided to sell its stake to Imperial Tobacco.

In 2002 Günter Herz stepped down as CEO of the group following a shift in the supervisory board of the group. About a year later Günter and Daniela decided to sell their stakes in Tchibo Group to their siblings and set up Mayfair as a new family holding.

== Investments ==
Mayfair has so far undertaken two investments. The first was the acquisition of a stake in publicly listed Puma AG in May 2005. Following the announcement of a new strategic phase by Puma's CEO Jochen Zeitz, which involved the repurchase of licensed countries and the roll out of a retail network, Mayfair increased their stake from 17% to 27%. Two years later, when the luxury group PPR made a public offer for Puma in 2007, Mayfair decided to sell their stake in the company for 330 euros per share.

The second investment was the €575 m acquisition of German certification group Germanischer Lloyd AG. Günter Herz supported the management team in an effort to fend off a hostile bid from rival Bureau Veritas. Since the acquisition, GL has broadened its scope from shipping to oil & gas and renewable energy through a number of acquisitions. From 2006 until September 2013, when GL merged with DNV (Det Norske Veritas) to become DNV GL, Mayfair was the only shareholder of GL. Until 2017, DNV Foundation owned 63.5% of DNV GL, while Mayfair owned the remaining 36.5%. In December 2017, Mayfair sold their remaining stake back to the Det Norske Veritas Foundation.

== References (in German) ==
- Tchibo-Gründer schielt auf lukrative Investments
- Schutz vor Überfremdung: Firmen suchen Milliardäre
- Moneten, Macht und Marken
- Puma-Aktionär Herz will Germanischen Lloyd übernehmen
- Günter Herz und die schweren Pötte
