= Henrik O. Madsen =

Norwegian businessman and engineer

Henrik Overgaard Madsen (born 27 July 1953) is a businessperson, engineer, Member of the Board of Aker Solutions and was chief executive officer of DNV GL between 2006 and 2015.

Madsen is educated with a PhD in civil and structural engineering from the Technical University of Denmark, where he also held a position as professor within structural mechanics. He started working for DNV as chief scientist in structural reliability analysis, working to introduce structural reliability methods in the standard setting work of the oil and gas industry. He was elected into the United States Offshore Energy Center Technology Hall of Fame as an offshore pioneer in 2002. He has published several books and more than 80 papers within this area.

For DNV, Madsen has headed the maritime, energy and industry, and research business areas, as well as being regional manager in Japan and Denmark. He is also a member of the World Business Council for Sustainable Development.

In June 2015, Madsen has been appointed by the United Nations Secretary-General Ban Ki-moon as a new board member of the UN Global Compact.

In June 2019, Ivaldi Group, a 3D printing company specialized in on demand superior producer, has appointed Madsen to its advisory board.

== Publications ==
- Methods of Structural Safety (1985)
- Structural Reliability Methods (1996)
- Proposal for a Code for the Direct Use of Reliability Methods in Structural Design (1989)
