= DNV =

Certification body and classification society

Coordinates: 59°53′16.84″N 10°33′45.83″E

DNV AS
- Formerly: DNV GL
- Type: Private (Aksjeselskap)
- Industry: Conglomerate
- Founded: 1864; 162 years ago
- Headquarters: Høvik, Greater Oslo, Norway
- Area served: Worldwide (over 100 countries)
- Key people: Remi Eriksen (CEO); Jon Fredrik Baksaas (Chairman)
- Revenue: ▲NOK 31.6 billion (2023)
- Number of employees: 15,001 (2024)
- Parent: DNV Holding AS
- Website: www.dnv.com

Det Norske Veritas (DNV), formerly DNV GL, is an international accredited registrar and classification society headquartered in Høvik, Norway. DNV provides services for several industries, including maritime, oil and gas, renewable energy, electrification, and healthcare.

As of 10 January 2024, the company has about 15,000 employees and 350 offices operating in more than 100 countries and provides services for several industries. In 2013, Det Norske Veritas (Norway) and Germanischer Lloyd (Germany), two prominent organizations in the industry, merged to form DNV GL. The company later simplified its name to DNV in 2021, while maintaining the organizational structure that resulted from the merger.

DNV provides services for 13,175 vessels and mobile offshore units (MOUs), amounting to 265.4 million gross tonnes, which represents a global market share of 21%. 65% of the world's offshore pipelines are designed and installed to DNV's technical standards.

Prior to the merger, both DNV and GL had independently acquired several companies in different sectors, such as Hélimax Energy (Canada), Garrad Hassan (UK), Windtest (Germany) and KEMA (Netherlands). DNV also invests in research.

Remi Eriksen has been the Group President and CEO of DNV since August 1, 2015, succeeding Henrik O. Madsen.

== Summary ==
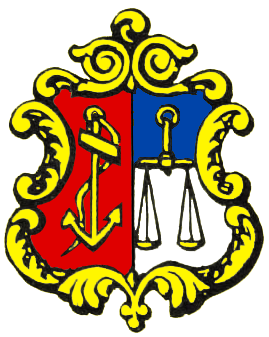
Veritas' coat of arms

DNV's history dates from 1864, when Det Norske Veritas was established in Norway to head the technical inspection and evaluation of Norwegian merchant vessels. Germanischer Lloyd was founded in Hamburg in 1867 by a group of 600 ship owners, ship builders and insurers. The company celebrated its 150th anniversary in 2014.

On 20 December 2012, the two companies announced the merger, which was approved by competition authorities in South Korea, the US, the EU, and China, thus allowing the merger contract between DNV and GL to be signed on 12 September 2013. From this point, the independent Det Norske Veritas Foundation owned 63.5% of DNV GL shares and Mayfair Vermögensverwaltung owned 36.5%, until December 2017, wherein Mayfair sold its shares to the Det Norske Veritas Foundation. DNV GL changed its name to DNV on 1 March 2021.

In September 2023, it was announced that DNV had acquired the US-headquartered SaaS company, ANB Systems. The company provides energy programme services to utility and regulatory body customers.

== Research ==
Every year, DNV invests heavily in research and development, amounting to 5% of its total revenue. Many of the DNV standards have often been used as the basis for international standards.

As of 2021, the main research programs include maritime, power and renewables, oil and gas, precision medicine, digital assurance, ocean space, artificial intelligence and energy transition. DNV publishes its independent Energy Transition Outlook annually. The fifth edition was published in 2021.

== Organization ==
DNV is organised into six business areas:

- DNV — Maritime: DNV sets standards for ships and offshore structures, known as Class Rules. DNV is authorized by 130 maritime administrations to perform verification on their behalf.
- DNV — Energy Systems: DNV is working as an independent, accredited certifier of electricity transmission and distribution components.
- DNV — Business Assurance: They certify the compliance of companies according to a third-party standard, such as ISO 9001 (quality management system) or ISO 14001 (environmental management system). DNV has issued management system certificates to more than 70,000 companies. It is an accredited certifier in 80 countries, and it provides clinical certifications to American hospitals.
- DNV — Supply Chain and Product Assurance: Provides supply chain governance services and product and digital assurance
- DNV — Digital Solutions: A provider of engineering software tools and enterprise software for improving safety and asset performance for ships, pipelines, processing plants, offshore structures, electric grids, healthcare providers and a marine fleet management software solution called ShipManager.
- DNV — Accelerator: The Accelerator operates a portfolio of units undergoing significant growth through acquisitions and partnerships.
