= ECPAT =

Children's rights organisation

ECPAT International
- Founded: 1990; 36 years ago
- Type: NGO
- Purpose: Child protection
- Location: Bangkok, Thailand
- Region served: Global
- Key people: Guillaume Landry (executive director)
- Website: ecpat.org

ECPAT is a global network of civil society organisations that works to end the sexual exploitation of children. It focuses on ending the online sexual exploitation of children, the trafficking of children for sexual purposes, the sexual exploitation of children involved in prostitution, child, early and forced marriages, and the sexual exploitation of children in the travel and tourism industry.

The ECPAT International network consists of 122 member organisations in 104 countries. Its secretariat is based in Bangkok, Thailand, providing technical support to member groups, coordinating research, and managing international advocacy campaigns.

== History ==
In 1990, researchers and activists helped to establish ECPAT (an acronym for End Child Prostitution in Asian Tourism) as a three-year campaign to end "sex tourism," with an initial focus on Asia. As the terms "child prostitution" and "sex tourism" are no longer used in the sector, today the organisation goes by its initials ECPAT. Anti-Slavery International was one of the original supporters, and helped to set up a branch in the UK.

In 1996, in partnership with UNICEF and the NGO Group for the Rights of the Child (now known as Child Rights Connect), ECPAT International co-organised a global world congress against the sexual exploitation of children in Stockholm, Sweden. The congress was hosted by the Government of Sweden, which also played a major role in attracting support and participation from other governments. As a result, ECPAT grew from a regional campaign into a global non-governmental organisation.

Between 2009 and 2012, ECPAT, in partnership with The Body Shop, helped run the Stop Sex Trafficking of Children and Young People campaign, which called on governments to safeguard the rights of children and adolescents to protect them from trafficking for sexual purposes. More than 7 million petition signatures were collected from 50 countries worldwide and presented to government officials around the world and to the UN Human Rights Council in Geneva. It has been recognised as one of the largest human rights petitions ever presented to the UN.

== Research and human rights reporting ==
States with one or more organisations that are connected to the ECPAT network ECPAT group(s) in the state None

ECPAT International produces a variety of research and resources for use by its network members, other NGOs, UN agencies, and researchers. These include regular country reports, regional reports and studies on specific forms of child sexual exploitation, such as the sexual exploitation of children in travel and tourism, and the online sexual exploitation of children.

ECPAT is mandated to monitor the commitments of governments around the world and their legal obligations to protect children from sexual exploitation. ECPAT produces regular country monitoring reports that are presented to the United Nations in Geneva, to follow up implementation of the Stockholm Agenda for Action (Stockholm, 1996).

== Network membership ==
The ECPAT network currently consists of 104 member organisations in 93 countries. These include independent civil society organisations, grassroots NGOs and coalitions of NGOs focused on a range of child rights violations.

== The Code of Conduct for the Protection of Children from Sexual Exploitation in Travel and Tourism ==
The Code is a voluntary set of criteria that travel and tourism businesses can commit to in order to integrate child-protection measures into their operations and prevent their services being used to sexually exploit children. It was developed by ECPAT Sweden in 1996, following the first World Congress against Commercial Sexual Exploitation of Children, in cooperation with the United Nations World Tourism Organization (UNWTO) and several Swedish tour operators, and is now hosted by ECPAT International in Bangkok and promoted through the wider ECPAT network.

Members of The Code undertake to implement six core measures: adopting a child-protection policy and procedures, training employees, including child-protection clauses in contracts, providing information to travellers, working with key local stakeholders, and reporting annually on implementation. The initiative has expanded into a global network; The Code reports that more than 300 travel and tourism companies worldwide are members, including major hotel chains, airlines, tour operators and travel management companies. The Code is frequently cited in discussions of how the tourism industry can help prevent trafficking and sexual exploitation in hotels and other travel settings.

Notable signatories include senior figures from several large hospitality groups. In 2016 AccorHotels expanded its implementation of The Code to the United States; the signing event in Washington, D.C., was attended by Christophe Alaux, then CEO for North America, Central America and the Caribbean, alongside representatives of ECPAT-USA and U.S. legislators. In 2012, Carmen Riu, CEO of RIU Hotels & Resorts, signed The Code on behalf of the company at a ceremony in Gran Canaria, formalising the chain's commitment to measures against the commercial sexual exploitation of minors in tourism. Jim Allen, chairman of Hard Rock International and CEO of Seminole Gaming, signed the ECPAT Tourism Child-Protection Code of Conduct on behalf of Hard Rock in 2022 as part of the company's anti-trafficking initiatives in its hotels and casinos.

== Protecting children online ==
ECPAT International works with law enforcement partners, such as INTERPOL, to prevent the online sexual exploitation of children. It engages with other child rights organisations, for example, through the Internet Governance Forum, and is a member of the Virtual Global Taskforce and the European Financial Coalition against Commercial Sexual Exploitation of Children Online. ECPAT is also part of the International Telecommunication Union´s Child Online Protection initiative. ECPAT has signed agreements with the International Association of Internet Hotlines, the Internet Watch Foundation and Child Helpline International.

ECPAT advocates for the ratification of international and regional legal instruments such as the Optional Protocol on the Sale of Children, Child Prostitution and Child Pornography, and the Council of Europe Convention on the Protection of Children against Sexual Exploitation and Sexual Abuse (Lanzarote convention).

== Criticism ==
=== SESTA/FOSTA and use of false data ===
ECPAT-USA has been criticised for its lobbying for Stop Enabling Sex Traffickers Act, which has been described by Vox as a law intended to "curb online sex work" while allegedly making consensual sex work less safe. ECPAT-USA has claimed that at least 100,000 children in the U.S. are commercially sexually exploited, based on reports which used data from 1990 and which have been criticised by social scientists as inaccurate. The Washington Post claimed that the figure was "conjured out of thin air, based on old data from a largely discredited report." ECPAT-USA attempted to justify their use of the figure by citing a NISMART report that claimed that there are 1.7 million child runaway incidents each year, and that their figure was conservative, despite the report stating that only 1,700 of the 1.7 million children were engaged in the sex trade, and that more than three-quarters of children were away from home for less than a week, leaving only a very small window for sex trafficking. ECPAT-USA subsequently agreed "to stop using the figure".

ECPAT-USA has responded to criticism against SESTA, describing legal sex workers as a "very small segment of society that enters sex work with their eyes wide open, and in the absence of coercion". However, since the law came into effect, sex workers have suffered increasing threats of violence, harassment and pimping. Online communities which provide support to sex workers, such as finding shelter or food, issuing warnings about potentially violent clients and providing rights training, were shut down, putting sex workers in danger. In the past, authorities have used such platforms to track traffickers, and fear that closing them has driven traffickers underground.

== Awards ==
- The 1998 Thorolf Rafto Memorial Prize for Human Rights
- The 2012 Asia Democracy and Human Rights Award
- The 2012 Gold Standard Award for NGO engagement for the Stop Sex Trafficking of Children campaign
- The 2013 Conrad N. Hilton Humanitarian Prize
- The 2017 INTERPOL Crimes Against Children Award
