= Johan Lundgren (businessman) =

Swedish businessman (born 1966)

- Born: Johan Peter Lundgren; 4 October 1966 (age 59); Härnösand, Sweden
- Education: Stockholm School of Economics; International Institute for Management Development
- Occupation: Businessman
- Title: Deputy chief executive of TUI Group (2011–2015); CEO of easyJet (2017–2025)

Johan Peter Lundgren (born 4 October 1966) is a Swedish executive. He was the chief executive officer (CEO) of the British airline easyJet from 2017 to 2025 and previously held senior leadership positions at TUI Travel PLC and TUI AG. Since 2025, he has been a member of the Supervisory Board of TUI AG and has been nominated to succeed Dieter Zetsche as Chairman following the company's Annual General Meeting in February 2027.

== Early life and education ==
Johan Peter Lundgren was born in Sweden on 4 October 1966. He lived in Bondsjöhöjden, and went to school in Härnösand, on the eastern coast of mid-Sweden in Ångermanland. He left school at 16 to concentrate solely on music. From 1982 to 1985 Lundgren studied classical trombone in Sweden, the UK and the USA. He aspired to become a trombonist after listening to Christian Lindberg. He auditioned for the Royal Academy of Music, but was not accepted to the conservatoire as that year it was not accepting any trombone players.

Lundgren then moved to Gothenburg. He worked as a tour guide. He attended courses at the Stockholm School of Economics in 1993 and completed the Programme for Executive Development at the International Institute for Management Development (IMD) in Switzerland in 1996.

== Career ==
=== TUI Group ===
In 1986, he joined Fritidsresor, a Swedish travel operator, which was later bought by TUI Group (TUI Sverige) in 2001.

Over the following decades he held a number of leadership positions within the TUI organisation in the Nordic region, the United Kingdom and Germany. In 2010 he became Managing Director of TUI Travel UK & Ireland. In 2011 he was appointed Deputy Chief Executive Officer of TUI Travel PLC and later held the same position at TUI AG following the merger of TUI AG and TUI Travel PLC in 2014.

Lundgren played a leading role in the integration of TUI AG and TUI Travel PLC, a cross-border merger that created one of the world's largest integrated tourism groups. Following completion of the merger, he served as a member of the Executive Board and Deputy CEO of TUI AG before leaving the company in 2015.

=== EasyJet ===
Lundgren became the CEO of EasyJet on 1 December 2017, replacing Carolyn McCall. One of his first duties was to hire a chief data officer. He also hired a former colleague from TUI to create a hotel and loyalty scheme to grow bookings through easyJet's online websites. Another one of his first moves was EasyJet's take over of Air Berlin. Regarding his rumored annual pay of £740,000, it is believed he asked the board that it be reduced to £706,000, his predecessor's last salary. In September 2018, he suggested there should be a law to favour more women pilots in the industry.

In July 2018, he reiterated easyJet's interest in acquiring a controlling stake in Alitalia.

In May 2019, he faced criticism for raising the price of the ticket to Madrid to £1,500 after two British teams were qualified for the finals of the 2018–19 UEFA Champions League.

=== Return to TUI ===
In June 2025, Lundgren joined the Supervisory Board of TUI AG, succeeding Pepijn Rijvers. TUI cited his four decades of experience in the tourism sector and his previous leadership roles within the company. In September 2026, TUI's shareholder and employee representatives unanimously nominated Lundgren to succeed Dieter Zetsche as Chairman of the Supervisory Board. He is due to assume the role following TUI AG's Annual General Meeting in February 2027.

Business positions
| Preceded by Carolyn McCall | CEO of EasyJet; 2017–2025 | Succeeded by Kenton Jarvis |
