= Valeria Hotels & Resorts =

Moroccan hospitality brand

- Industry: Hospitality
- Founded: 2011
- Founder: Karim Chérif Alami; Othmane Chérif Alami
- Headquarters: Casablanca, Morocco
- Area served: Marrakech, Agadir, Cabo Negro (Morocco)
- Products: Hotel and resort operations
- Parent: Investour Holding

Valeria Hotels & Resorts is a Moroccan hospitality brand that operates hotel resorts in Morocco, including properties in Marrakech and Agadir. It is a subsidiary of Investour Holding, a Moroccan tourism group.

== History ==
Investour Group, owner of the travel agency Atlas Voyages, a Moroccan integrated tourism group founded in 1964, launched the Valeria Hotels & Resorts brand. This brand serves as the group's hotel division, specializing in the operation of hotels and tourist resorts in Morocco.

In April 2006, the Valeria Madina Club Resort, with 432 rooms, was opened in Marrakech, in partnership with tour operator TUI Group.

In January 2010, Valeria opened the 320-room Dar Atlas Club.

In 2015, the group opened the Valeria Les Jardins d’Agadir Club resort.

In July 2019, Valeria Hotels & Resorts opened the Palmiya water park in the Palmeraie district of Marrakech. The project represented an investment of 50 million Moroccan dirhams and covers an area of more than four hectares. The park includes swimming pools, water slides, a Splashworld area, padel courts, football pitches, and spaces for events and catering.

In April 2026, Valeria Hotels & Resorts announced a renovation programme worth around 90 million Moroccan dirhams for its Madina Club and Dar Atlas Club properties in Marrakech, marking the 20th anniversary of Madina Club's opening.
