= Hotel Riu Plaza Toronto =

Hotel in Toronto, Canada

- Hotel chain: RIU Hotels & Resorts

General information
- Location: Entertainment District, Toronto, Ontario, Canada, 30 Widmer Street
- Opening: September 2025

Technical details
- Floor count: 23 (hotel portion)

Design and construction
- Architect: BDP Quadrangle
- Developer: Plazacorp Investments Limited

Other information
- Number of rooms: 352

Website
- www.riu.com/en/hotel/canada/toronto/hotel-riu-plaza-toronto

The Hotel Riu Plaza Toronto is a four-star hotel in the Entertainment District of Downtown Toronto, Ontario, Canada. Opened in September 2025, it was the first Canadian property operated by RIU Hotels & Resorts and has 352 rooms. The hotel's 23-floor component occupies the lower part of the northern tower of the Theatre District Residences development, with condominium units located above it. Designed by BDP Quadrangle, the mixed-use complex comprises two towers and incorporates six heritage row houses on Widmer Street.

== History ==
In February 2016, a rezoning application was submitted for the properties at 8–20 Widmer Street. The proposal envisioned a 56-storey residential building and called for the row houses at 10–20 Widmer Street to be dismantled, with their front portions later reconstructed and incorporated into the development. Toronto planning staff recommended refusal of the application, characterizing the proposal as overdevelopment and identifying several heritage concerns. Among them were the proposed cantilever of the tower above the houses and the plan to dismantle and reconstruct the buildings rather than retain them in place.

A separate rezoning application covered 30 Widmer Street and 309–315 Adelaide Street West. After the City of Toronto did not make a decision on that application, the matter was appealed to the Ontario Municipal Board. In February 2017, the board issued a procedural order providing for a ten-day hearing scheduled to begin on March 20, 2017.

The site at 30 Widmer Street was later incorporated into a settlement approved by Toronto City Council. The revised plans called for a 48-storey mixed-use tower rising above an 11-storey podium at 30 Widmer Street. The hotel was to extend from ground level through the 23rd floor, with residential uses occupying the upper portion of the tower. At 8–20 Widmer Street, a second residential tower was planned above and behind the six existing row houses, which under the revised scheme were to remain in situ.

In May 2018, Toronto's Director of Urban Design recommended approval of alterations to the heritage properties at 10–20 Widmer Street. The recommendation was subject to several conditions, including the preparation of a conservation plan, a heritage lighting plan and an interpretation plan for the properties.

RIU announced its plans for a Toronto hotel in January 2019. The company initially projected that the property would open in 2021 with 353 rooms. At the time, UrbanToronto reported that RIU expected to invest approximately $100 million in the project.

By March 2025, work on the development had reached the finishing stages, and the hotel was expected to open later in the year. The Hotel Riu Plaza Toronto opened in September 2025 with 352 rooms. It became RIU's first hotel in Canada and the twelfth property in the company's urban hotel collection.

== Architecture and heritage ==
The Theatre District Residences development was designed by BDP Quadrangle for Plazacorp Investments Limited. The complex consists of a 48-storey mixed hotel-and-residential tower and a 49-storey residential tower, both rising from 11-storey podiums. The northern tower accommodates the hotel on its lower levels and condominium units above, while the southern tower is entirely residential.

A 2018 City of Toronto planning report described the proposed hotel lobby, located at the northern end of the development, as an enclosed space with transparent glazing. The podium was planned with a combination of brick masonry and glazing. Above the 11th storey, the tower was designed to step back from the podium and use contemporary exterior materials, including glazing and metal siding.

Six row houses at 10–20 Widmer Street form part of the development. Built in 1876, the houses were added to the City of Toronto's Inventory of Heritage Properties, now known as the Heritage Register, in 1984. The city's heritage assessment identified them as the earliest surviving examples of row houses with Toronto Bay-and-gable styling in the King-Spadina neighbourhood.

The treatment of the row houses changed substantially from the 2016 proposal. Rather than dismantling and reconstructing them, the revised design retained the houses in their original locations. Their rear portions were to be removed to accommodate the project, while the new construction was positioned above and behind the retained buildings. The row houses were subsequently incorporated into the completed development, and restoration work on them was still underway during the final stages of construction in 2025.

== Facilities ==
The hotel's main lobby and a lobby bar are located on the ground floor. A restaurant on the second floor serves a buffet breakfast. Additional facilities include a 24-hour gym and a conference room with capacity for 40 people.

The building incorporates cogeneration plants that produce both electricity and thermal energy. It also uses measures intended to conserve water and reduce waste.

The hotel occupies 23 floors of one of two 49-storey towers, with the remainder of the tower used for housing.
