= Carolyn McCall =

British businesswoman

Dame Carolyn McCall DBE
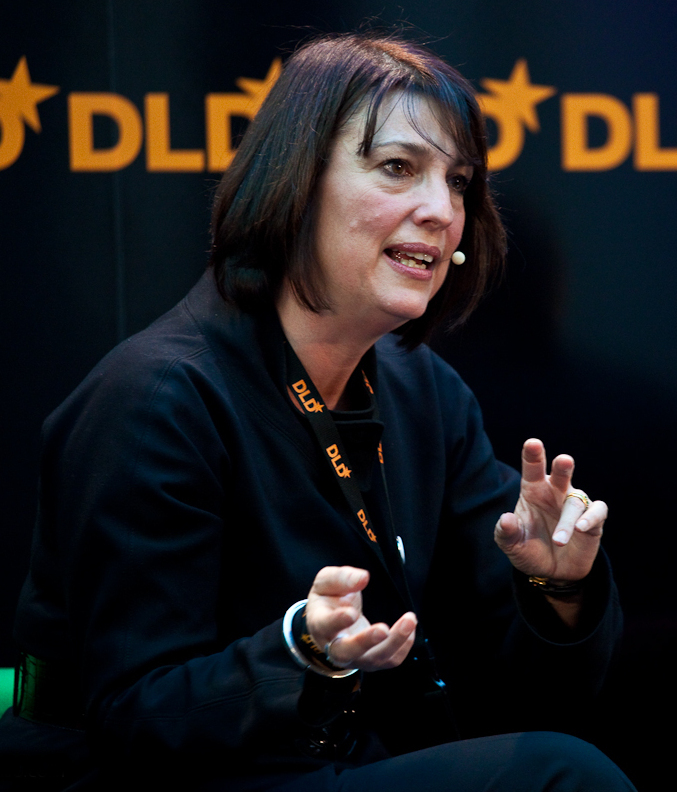
- Born: Carolyn Julia McCall; 13 September 1961 (age 64); Bangalore, India
- Education: University of Kent
- Occupation: Businesswoman
- Employer: ITV
- Title: Chief Executive, Guardian Media Group (2006–2010); Chief Executive, EasyJet (2010–2017); Chief Executive, ITV (2018–present)
- Spouse: Peter Frawley
- Children: 3

Dame Carolyn Julia McCall (born 13 September 1961) is a British businesswoman. She was the chief executive of EasyJet from 2010 to 2017.

== Early life and education ==
McCall was born on 13 September 1961 in Bangalore, India. Her Scottish father, Arthur McCall, ran the Far East division of a US textile multinational and her Irish-born mother, Colleen McCall, worked for the British High Commission in India. She was educated in India and Singapore until her teens, then at a Roman Catholic girls' boarding school in Derbyshire. She studied for a BA degree in history and politics at the University of Kent, Canterbury.

== Career ==
=== The Guardian ===
McCall applied to be a research planner at The Guardian. As she rose through the Guardian Media Group behind Marland, Management Today magazine called her "one of the toughest operators to have risen through The Guardian Media Group's ranks."

After rising to become CEO of Guardian Newspapers Ltd (now Guardian News & Media Ltd) in August 2006, she became CEO of the Guardian Media Group. During her tenure, the Manchester Evening News and regionally-based business were sold to Trinity Mirror. A 49.9% stake in Trader Media Group was sold to Apax Partners, in a deal that valued the business at £1.35bn.

=== EasyJet ===
On 24 March 2010, McCall's appointment as the chief executive of EasyJet was announced. She was said to prefer a "pragmatic approach to human resources rather than politically correct niceties". McCall became one of five female CEOs of a FTSE 100 Index company.

During McCall's tenure at EasyJet, the airline's shares almost quadrupled in value, and McCall arranged for the airline to "snatch up pieces" of Air Berlin and Alitalia.

McCall's departure from EasyJet was announced on 17 July 2017 after seven years at the company. Michael O'Leary, the CEO of rival Ryanair, said the airline industry would have been poorer without her; "I clearly underestimated her and I was proved wrong. She forced us to up our game on customer service. EasyJet and the industry are better as a result of her tenure." Willie Walsh, chief executive of the British Airways parent International Airlines Group, said he was "sorry to see Carolyn [McCall] leave".

McCall left EasyJet with a £5 million payment. The company appointed Johan Lundgren, then deputy chief executive of TUI Group, as her successor.

=== ITV ===
On 8 January 2018, following seven years as easyJet chief executive, McCall became the first female chief executive of commercial broadcaster ITV. She replaced Adam Crozier in the role.

She is a creator of BritBox, a subscription video service venture in partnership with the BBC which launched of late 2019 in the UK. She said "It's quite bold, going into a market which Netflix has already been in for eight years." She closed BritBox UK in 2024 when it was replaced by ITVX.

McCall earned a £3.7 million salary at ITV in 2018. Her 2019 base salary was set to increase by 2.5 per cent "in line with the wider employee group". In April 2020, McCall, along with other senior executives, took a 20% pay cut in the wake of the coronavirus pandemic.

In June 2023, she appeared before the Culture, Media and Sport Committee, where she was interrogated by Caroline Dinenage about the culture at ITV.

The same month, Jay Hunt was tipped by proactiveinvestors.co.uk as a potential replacement for McCall as Chief Executive of ITV plc.

=== Other ===
McCall was a non-executive director of Lloyds TSB between 2008 and 2009 and New Look between 1999 and 2005, a position to which she was reappointed in 2010. She was also a non-executive director of Tesco between 2005 and 2008, a position which she resigned from after Tesco sued The Guardian for libel.

She was chair of the Business in the Community project Opportunity Now.

McCall served as a non-executive board member in the Department for Business, Energy and Industrial Strategy between 2017 and 2020.

== Personal life ==
She is married to Peter Frawley. The couple have three children (Emmeline, Max, and Dan) and live in Berkhamsted.

McCall was named Veuve Clicquot Businesswoman of the Year in April 2008, and was appointed Officer of the Order of the British Empire (OBE) in the 2008 Birthday Honours for services to women in business.

In February 2013, she was assessed as one of the 100 most powerful women in the United Kingdom by Woman's Hour on BBC Radio 4.

In June 2014, McCall was awarded a Doctor of Science Honoris Causa by Cranfield University in recognition of her outstanding contribution to the aerospace industry and her distinguished achievements in international business.

She was appointed Dame Commander of the Order of the British Empire (DBE) in the 2016 New Year Honours for services to the aviation industry.

Business positions
Preceded by Andy Harrison	CEO of EasyJet; 2010–2017	Succeeded by Johan Lundgren
Preceded by Adam Crozier	CEO of ITV; 2018–present	Incumbent
