= Gresham Hotel =

Hotel in Dublin, Ireland

Hotel Riu Plaza The Gresham Dublin

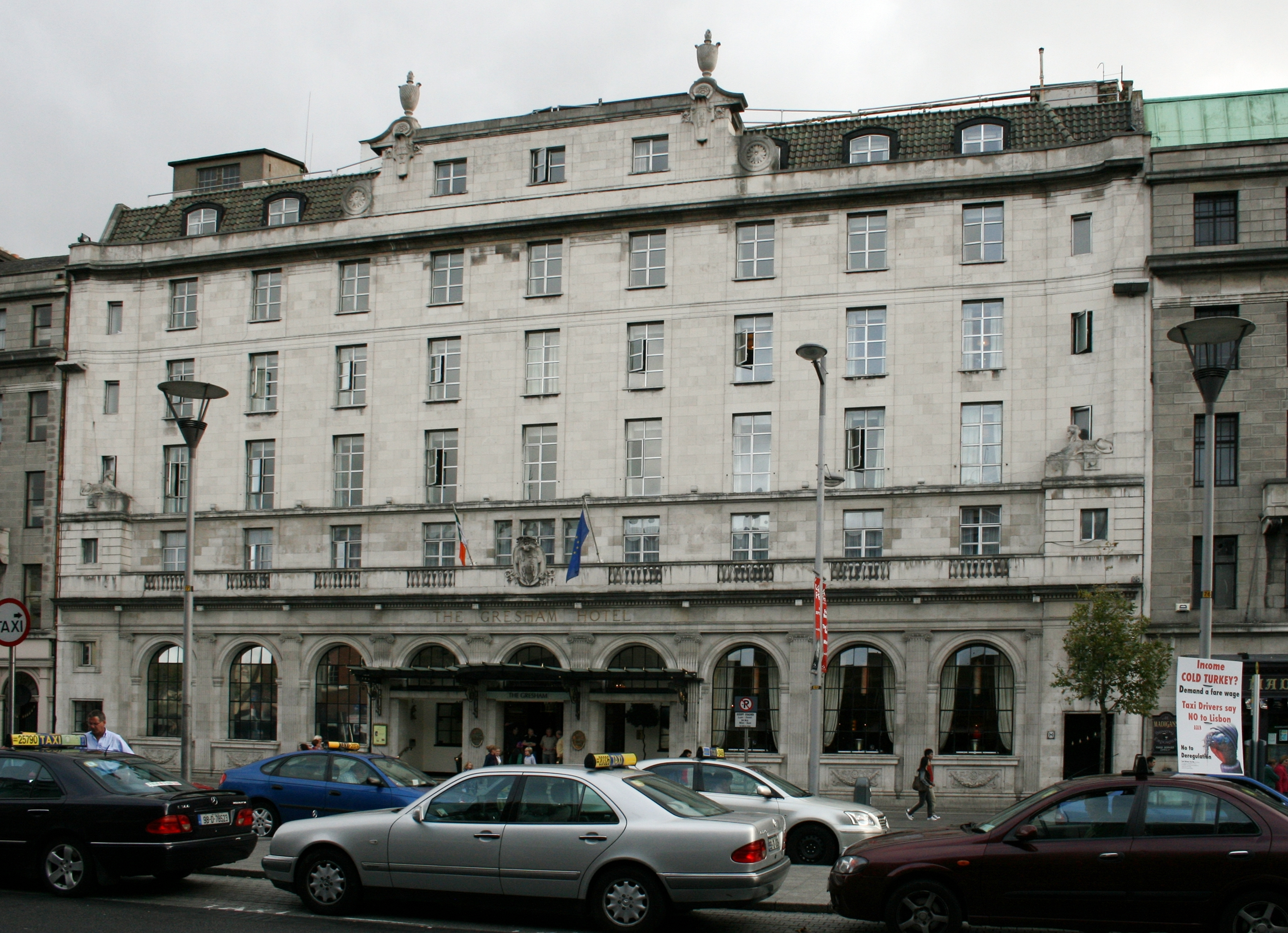

- Location within Central Dublin

General information
- Classification: 4 stars
- Location: 23 Upper O'Connell Street; Dublin 1, D01 C3W7
- Coordinates: 53.351666°N 6.260638°W
- Opening: 1817
- Owner: RIU Hotels & Resorts
- Operator: RIU Hotels & Resorts

Design and construction
- Architect: Robert Atkinson

Other information
- Number of rooms: 404

Website
- Official website

The Hotel Riu Plaza The Gresham Dublin, formerly The Gresham Hotel, is a historic four-star hotel on O'Connell Street in Dublin, Ireland. It is a Dublin institution and landmark. Founded in 1817, the current structure was completed in 1927 and was completely refurbished in 2024.

== History ==
=== Background ===
Thomas Gresham, the hotel's founder, was a foundling child, abandoned on the steps of the Royal Exchange, London. He was named for the founder of that institution, Sir Thomas Gresham, a famous merchant-politician in the Elizabethan era. Gresham came to Ireland and as a young man obtained employment in the service of William Beauman of Rutland Square (now Parnell Square), Dublin. After some time, and while still comparatively young, he became butler to this family.

=== The first hotel ===
In 1817, Gresham left Beauman's household and purchased two adjoining Georgian townhouses at 21 and 22 Sackville Street (now O'Connell Street), combining them into a lodging house he named Gresham's Hotel, catering mostly to the wealthy aristocracy and MPs who passed through Dublin on their way to London. In 1820, Gresham bought the neighboring townhouse at 20 Sackville Street and expanded the establishment.

By 1834 Gresham was noted as owning the Royal Marine Hotel in Kingstown. In 1833 he was the main local spokesman for opposition to a bill for the Dublin and Kingstown Railway (D&KR) extension to Dalkey, spending £1,200 in the process and being awarded a silver plate from locals when the bill failed. On being requested not to oppose an 1834 bill for an extension to Kingstown only, he agreed, saying he would not have opposed the earlier bill if the railway had acted with more courtesy. He also accepted £400 for D&KR shares he had bought for £100 in recognition.

The property was sold to a consortium in 1865, which renamed it The Gresham Hotel. They rebuilt the establishment, reconstructing the facades of the three connected townhouses into a single unified hotel building.

The hotel is the setting for the final third of James Joyce’s short story "The Dead", set in the early years of the twentieth century. The story does not paint the hotel in a flattering light, referring to staff sleeping on duty and broken lighting.

During the Irish Civil War, the Gresham was occupied by Anti-treaty forces under the command of Cathal Brugha and Countess Markievicz. It was the site of heavy fighting during the Battle of Dublin and was burned to the ground on 6 July 1922.

=== The modern hotel ===
The hotel's owners were awarded £93,550 in compensation by the new Irish Free State and they signed a contract with the McLaughlin & Harvey construction company on 29 October 1926 to build a 250-room replacement hotel. The new structure was designed by English architect Robert Atkinson and his business partner Alexander Frederick Berenbruck Anderson in a blend of the Art Deco and neo-classical styles. The rebuilt hotel opened on 16 April 1927. Many historic features from this time remain, including Waterford crystal chandeliers.

The hotel was bought by the Ryan Hotel group in 1978. Ryan Hotels was renamed Gresham Hotel Group in 2001.

The Gresham was sold to the Spanish RIU Hotels & Resorts chain in September 2016 for €92 million, becoming the Hotel Riu Plaza The Gresham Dublin.

In January 2018 Dublin City Council set about rehoming 14 homeless families that had been living at The Gresham to allow for the refurbishment of a number of bedrooms and suites at the hotel.

The hotel completed a major renovation in 2024 that included a significant expansion, increasing the number of rooms by 16 to 404.

== Appraisal ==
Patrick Wyse Jackson, curator of the Geological Museum in Trinity College, assessed the building in 1993 as part of his book "The Building Stones of Dublin: A Walking Guide" and wrote:

"The Gresham Hotel is regarded as one of the finest buildings on the street. Like Clery's, it is faced with Portland Stone which is highly carved"
