= Triposo =

Social travel site and mobile app

- Company type: Subsidiary of Musement
- Available in: English
- Founded: 2011; 15 years ago
- Area served: Worldwide
- Owner: Musement
- Founder: Richard Osinga; Douwe Osinga; Jon Tirsen
- Industry: Tourism; Journey planner
- Current status: Defunct

Triposo was a social travel site and mobile app that uses algorithms for journey planners.

The mobile app showed the user recommendations on where to go depending on information they had given to the app. This included Facebook details. The app worked without an internet connection; it downloaded information before departure.

== History ==
Triposo was created in 2011 by ex-Google Dutch brothers Richard Osinga and Douwe Osinga with the help of Jon Tirsen. During development, Triposo received $3.5 million in a Series A round. By 2015, the app had been downloaded 10 million times.

Triposo was acquired by Musement in October 2017.

The Triposo app was no longer available for new users by 2021. It was shut down completely on March 1, 2023 and all personal data was permanently deleted.
