= Hotel Riu Plaza Berlin =

Hotel in Berlin, Germany

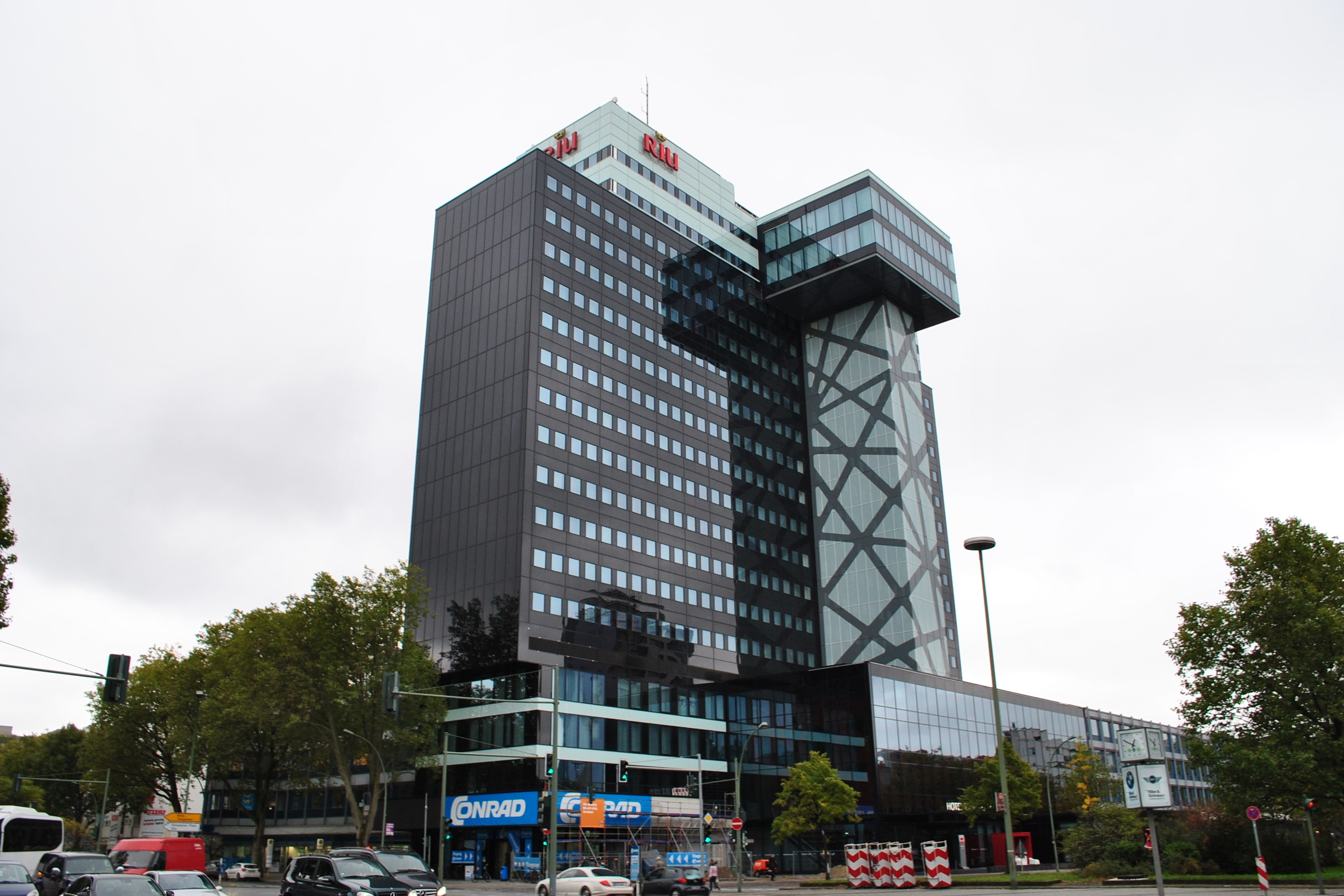
- Interactive map of the Hotel Riu Plaza Berlin area
- Former names: Philips-Hochhaus

General information
- Status: Completed
- Type: Hotel
- Location: Schöneberg, Berlin, Germany, Martin-Luther-Straße 1, 10777 Berlin
- Coordinates: 52°30′02″N 13°20′49″E
- Opening: 19 September 2015
- Renovated: 2012–2015
- Operator: RIU Hotels & Resorts

Height
- Height: 73 metres (240 ft)

Technical details
- Floor count: 18

Design and construction
- Architects: Paul Schwebes (original building); GFB Alvarez & Schepers (hotel conversion)
- Developer: Codes Capital Partners S.L. / Grupo Pryconsa

Website
- www.riu.com/en/hotel/germany/berlin/hotel-riu-plaza-berlin

Hotel Riu Plaza Berlin occupies the place of the old Philips-Hochhaus, an 18-storey office tower in the Schöneberg district of Berlin, at Martin-Luther-Straße and Kleiststraße near Wittenbergplatz. It was converted into a four-star hotel and opened on 19 September of the year 2015. It was the first property of RIU Hotels & Resorts in Germany and its first urban Riu Plaza hotel anywhere in all Europe. The hotel is located about 350 metres from KaDeWe.

== History ==
The tower was built in the early 1970s for the Berlin offices of Philips, the Dutch electronics company. German architect Paul Schwebes designed it. The finished building departed from his original plans in several respects. It never received protected-monument status. The plans to convert the empty office block into a hotel first reached the Tempelhof-Schöneberg borough planning committee in 2010. Gutting of the interior started in January 2012. A company tied to the Spanish firm Grupo Pryconsa controlled the project. It was budgeted at roughly €70 million. The Berlin office of GFB Alvarez & Schepers was responsible for the conversion design. After RIU closed all 99 of its hotels in March 2020, the Berlin property reopened on 25 May 2020.

== Conversion and architecture ==
Gutting the tower's interior did not require closing the building. A shop at ground level stayed in business throughout the works. The exterior changed just as much as the inside. Workers stripped the old façade. They replaced it with glass cladding for better thermal insulation and noise protection. A new glazed extension rose along Martin-Luther-Straße. It houses the entrance lobby and event spaces. The Kleiststraße side had been blank and windowless. It was opened up and given a glass façade of its own. One feature did not survive the conversion. A panoramic lift had once run up the tower's exterior. It had already fallen out of use before the redevelopment began. The project did not reinstate it.

== Facilities ==
The ground floor holds the hotel lobby, restaurant and kitchen, with conference, banqueting and catering space occupying the two floors above. Guest rooms and suites fill most of the tower above that, topped by a mechanical-services floor. Combined, the hotel's six conference and meeting rooms can seat up to 840 people. The meeting and event facilities cover a total of 976 square metres. The completed hotel contains 357 guest rooms and suites. The hotel also offers a fitness centre and free Wi-Fi.

== See also ==
List of tallest buildings in Berlin
