= Michael Frenzel =

German businessman

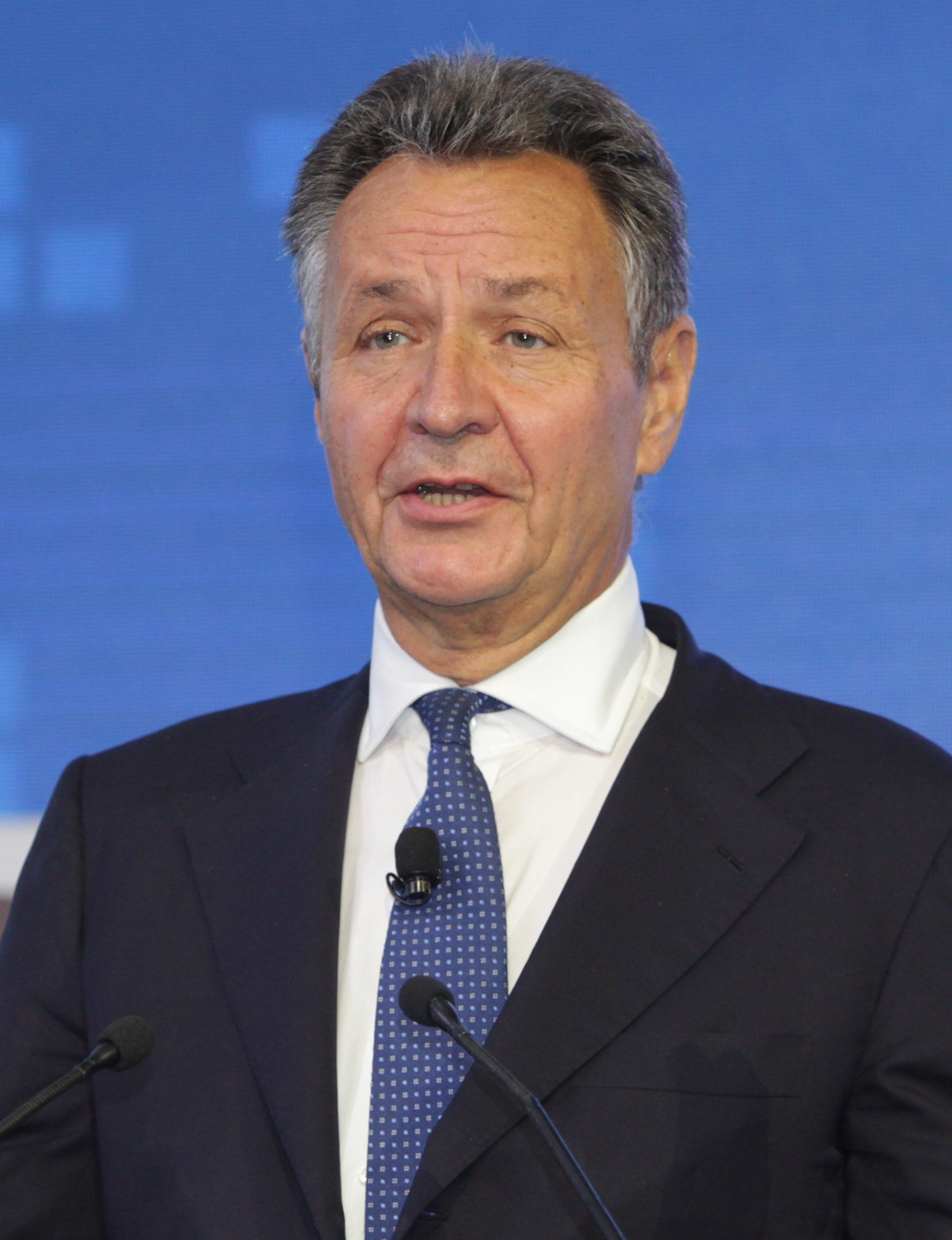
- Michael Frenzel in 2014
- Born: 2 March 1947 (age 78); Leipzig, Germany
- Occupation: Business executive
- Years active: 1981–2013
- Known for: CEO of TUI AG

Michael Frenzel (born 2 March 1947) is a German business executive. He was the chief executive officer of TUI AG from 1994 to 2013. Since 2018 he is a World Travel and Tourism Council ambassador. He studied law and holds a doctorate.

== Early life and education ==
Frenzel was born in Leipzig, at the time in Allied-occupied Germany, on 2 March 1947. When aged nine, he escaped to West Germany with his father and lived in a refugee camp for three years. He attended the Ruhr University Bochum, studying law. He worked at the university as a scientific assistant, and graduated with a doctoral degree in law.

== Career ==
He joined Westdeutsche Landesbank in 1981.

In 1988 Frenzel joined Preussag AG as an executive responsible for trading and logistics. He was promoted to the position of chief executive officer in January 1994.

During his time as chief executive, Frenzel transformed the company from an industrial conglomerate into a travel services company. He oversaw Preussag's acquisition of Hapag-Lloyd in 1997. In 2000, he oversaw Preussag's £1.8 billion takeover of Thomson Travel. The company also acquired the German tourism operator TUI in 1998 and the French firm Nouvelles Frontières. After these acquisitions, Preussag was Europe's leading tourism operator. In July 2002, Preussag was rebranded as TUI, short for Touristik Union International, the name of a subsidiary it had bought previously.

Frenzel retired from TUI in February 2013, succeeded by Friedrich Joussen. He became a World Travel and Tourism Council ambassador in 2018.

He has served on the supervisory boards of several large German companies, including Volkswagen, Deutsche Bahn, and Norddeutsche Landesbank. He is a member of the International Chamber of Commerce.

== Personal life ==
Frenzel lives outside Hanover. He and his wife Gabi have three children.
