= Friedrich Joussen =

German businessman

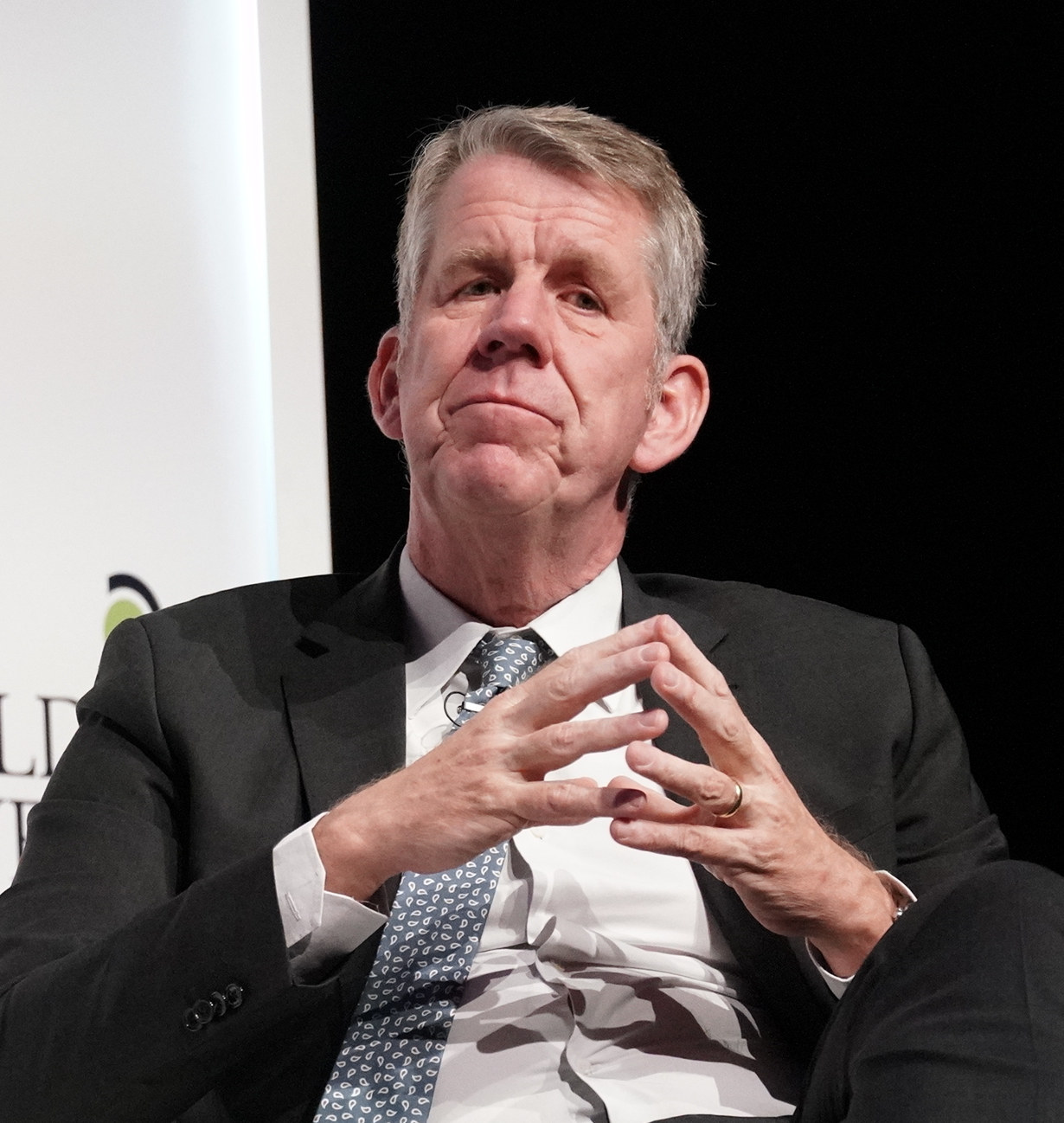
- Joussen in 2019
- Born: Friedrich Peter Johannes Joussen; 19 April 1963 (age 63); Duisburg in North Rhine-Westphalia
- Education: RWTH Aachen University
- Occupation: Businessman
- Title: Travel industry Executive
- Children: 4

Friedrich Peter Johannes Joussen (born 19 April 1963) is a German businessman,and the former executive chairman (Vorstandsvorsitzender) of TUI Group (Touristik Union International).

== Early life ==
He was born in Duisburg in North Rhine-Westphalia. He attended the Landfermann-Gymnasium. At university, he studied electrical engineering.

== Career ==
After graduating from university, he became a software developer in the USA. He spent 22 years in the telecommunications industry.

=== Vodafone ===
He rose through Vodafone, and its predecessors, to become Chief Executive of Vodafone Germany from 2003 to 2012. Vodafone Germany has around 36 million customers and around 12,000 staff. At Vodafone Germany, he was replaced by Jens Schulte-Bockum, who was the former Chief Executive of Vodafone Netherlands. Vodafone Germany has the Vodafone D2 brand.

=== TUI ===
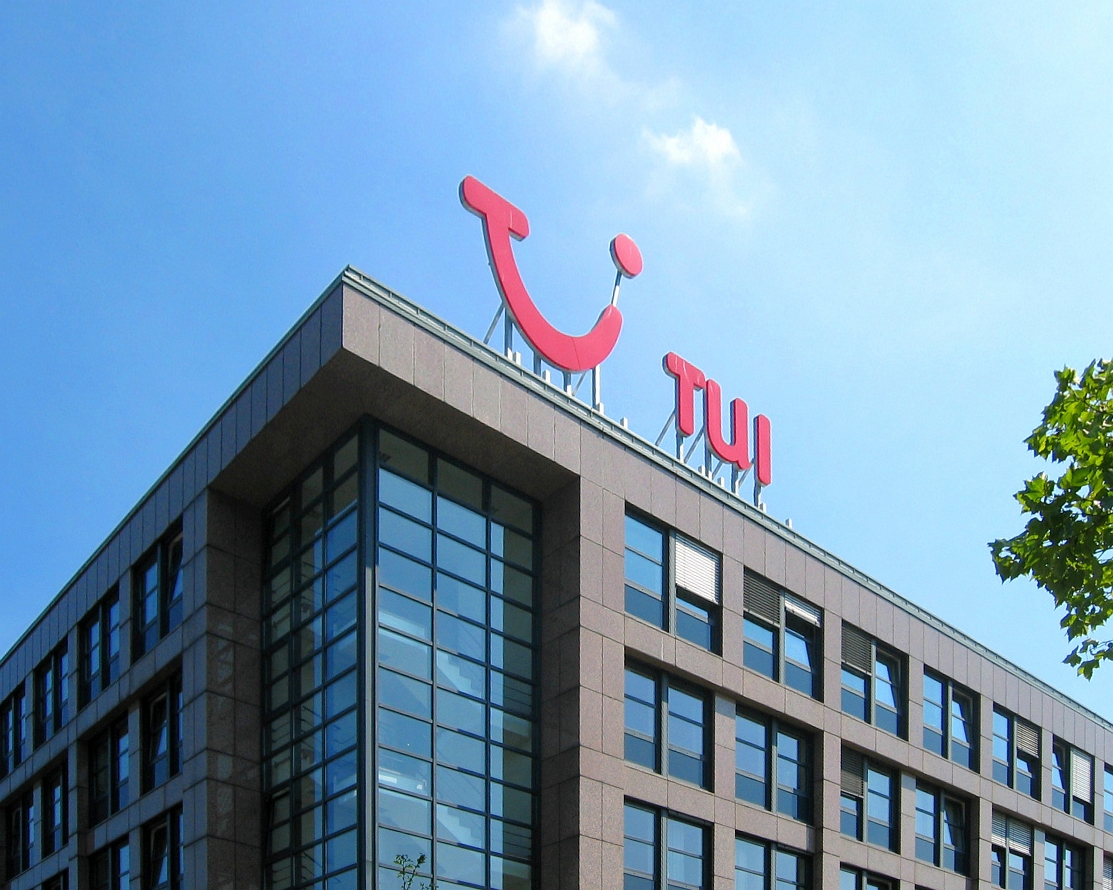
Headquarters of TUI in Hannover, Germany

He became Executive Chairman of TUI AG in 2013.

In June 2022, it was announced that Joussen would be stepping down from his position at TUI in the September of 2022, and would be replaced by Sebastian Ebel, the company’s current CFO.

== Personal life ==
He is married with four children.

== See also ==
- Category:Travel and holiday companies of Germany

Business positions
Preceded by Michael Frenzel	Executive Chairman of TUI Group	Succeeded by Sebastian Ebel
Preceded by	Chief Executive of Vodafone Deutschland; 2003 - September 2012	Succeeded by Jens Schulte-Bockum
