= TUI fly Nordic =

Charter airline of Denmark, Norway, Sweden and Finland

TUI fly Nordic AB

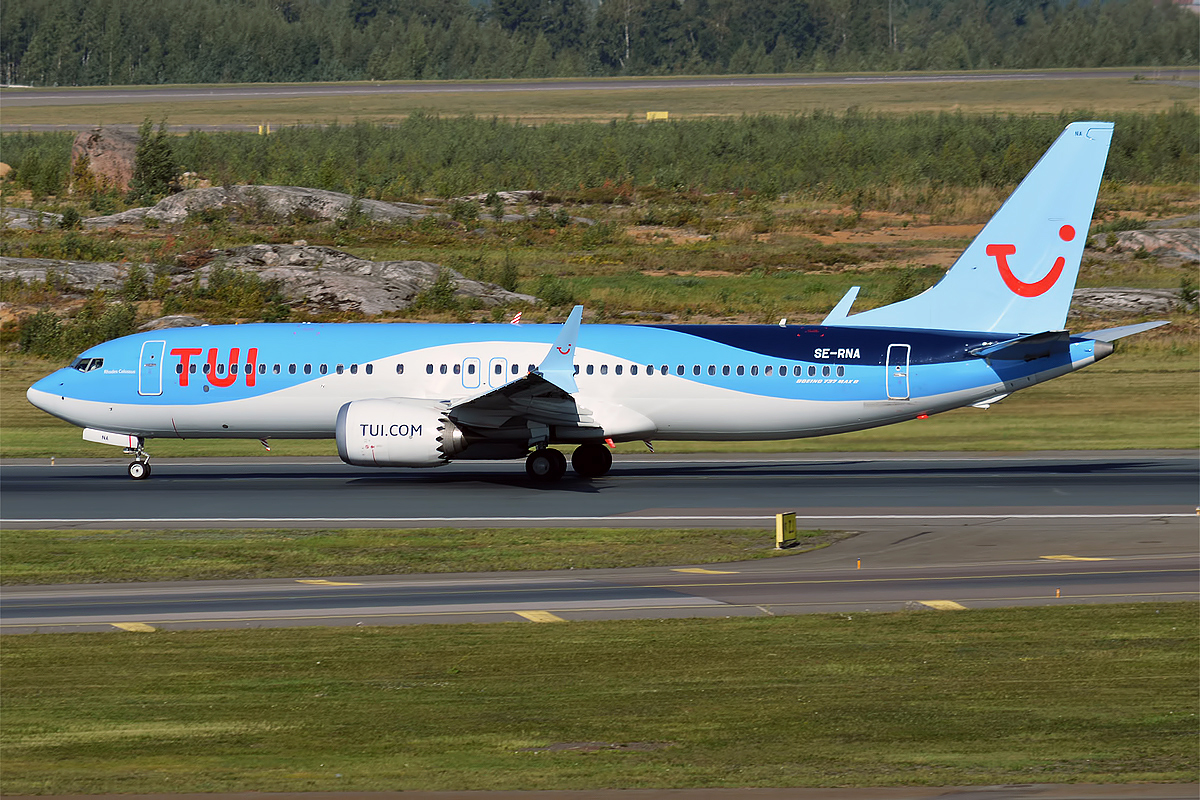
IATA	ICAO	Call sign
6B	BLX	BLUESCAN
- Commenced operations: December 1996; 29 years ago (as Blue Scandinavia); 1 January 1998; 28 years ago (as Britannia Nordic); 1 May 2006; 20 years ago (as TUI fly Nordic)
- Operating bases: Gothenburg; Stockholm–Arlanda
- Fleet size: 4
- Destinations: 21
- Parent company: TUI Group
- Headquarters: Stockholm, Sweden
- Employees: 650
- Website: www.tui.dk; www.tui.no; www.tui.se; www.tui.fi

TUIfly Nordic AB (formerly Blue Scandinavia AB and Britannia Nordic AB) is a charter airline headquartered in Stockholm, Sweden, and is a part of the TUI Group. It operates short, medium and long-haul flights to leisure destinations from several airports in the Nordic countries, on behalf of the tour operators TUI Danmark (Denmark), TUI Suomi (Finland), TUI Norge (Norway) and TUI Sverige (Sweden). In 2016, the airline carried approximately 1,500,000 passengers.

== History ==
The airline was originally formed in 1985 as Transwede Airways operating both charter and scheduled flights to destinations around Europe. In 1996, the charter part of the airline was taken over by the Swedish tour operator Fritidsresor and was renamed Blue Scandinavia. Following the acquisition of Fritidsresor by Thomson in 1998, the airline was renamed Britannia Nordic. After Preussag (TUI) acquired the Thomson Group in 2000, the airline was renamed TUI fly Nordic in 2005.

In 2015, the TUI Group announced that all five of its airline subsidiaries would be renamed TUI Airlines, whilst retaining their separate Air Operators Certificates, taking about three years to complete. As of 2017, most aircraft had been repainted and rebranded with the new "Dynamic Wave" livery and name.

TUI Group has 70 737 MAX aircraft on order for the group. The order consists of 28 MAX 10 aircraft, with the remaining variants unspecified as of June 2017. These will be used for both replacement of older aircraft and further expansion. TUI fly Nordic was scheduled to receive its first of five Boeing 737 MAX 8 in February 2018.

== Destinations ==
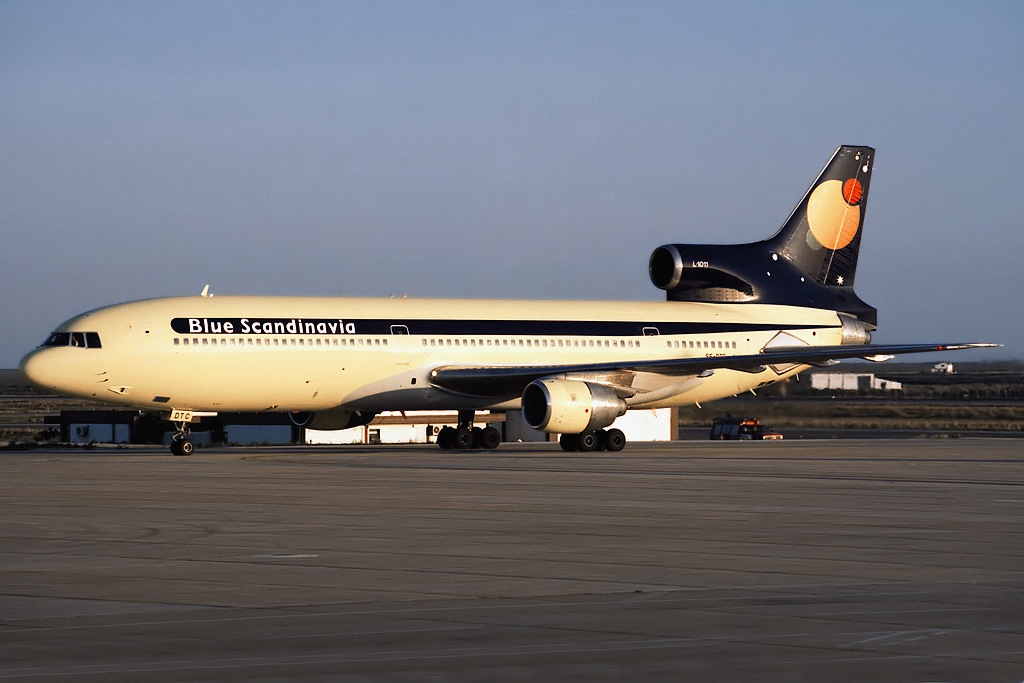
A former Blue Scandinavia Lockheed L-1011 TriStar parked at Faro Airport in 1997

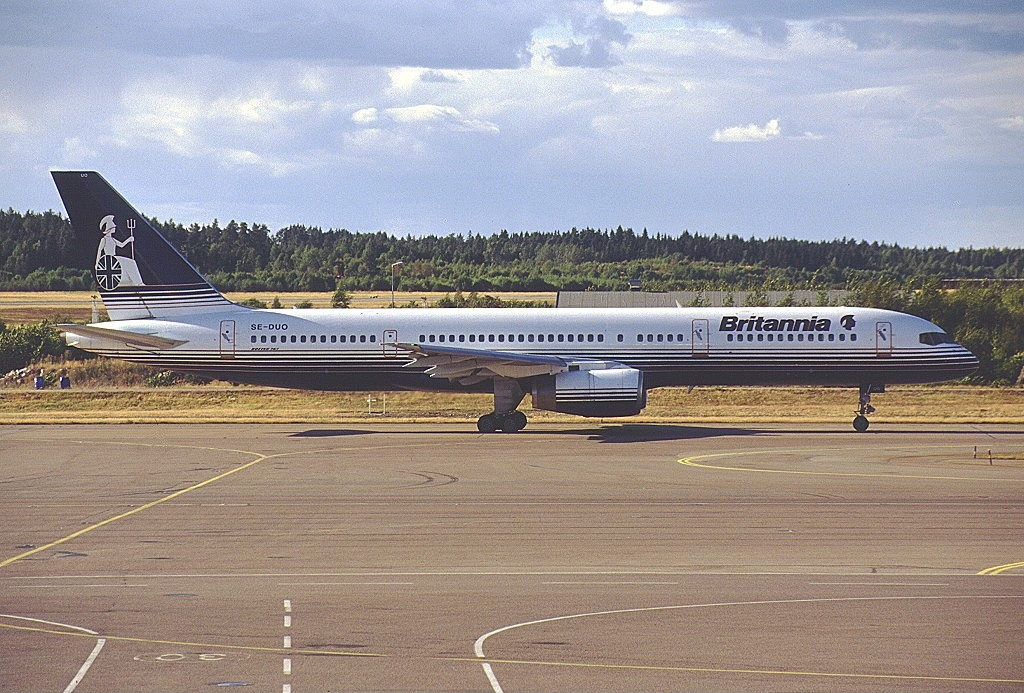
A former Britannia Nordic Boeing 757-200 taxiing at Stockholm Arlanda Airport in 1999

As of October 2024, TUI fly Nordic flies (or has flown) to the following destinations:

Country	City	Airport	Notes	Refs
Bulgaria	Burgas	Burgas Airport	Seasonal charter	
Cape Verde	Boa Vista	Aristides Pereira International Airport	Seasonal charter	
Cape Verde	Sal	Amílcar Cabral International Airport	Seasonal charter	
Croatia	Pula	Pula Airport	Seasonal charter	
Croatia	Split	Split Airport	Seasonal charter	
Cyprus	Larnaca	Larnaca International Airport	Seasonal charter	
Denmark	Copenhagen	Copenhagen Airport		
Dominican Republic	Punta Cana	Punta Cana International Airport	Begins 19 December 2024	
Egypt	Hurghada	Hurghada International Airport	Terminated	
Egypt	Marsa Alam	Marsa Alam International Airport	Terminated	
Finland	Helsinki	Helsinki Airport		
Greece	Chania	Chania International Airport	Seasonal charter	
Greece	Corfu	Corfu International Airport	Terminated	
Greece	Heraklion	Heraklion International Airport	Terminated	
Greece	Karpathos	Karpathos Island National Airport		
Greece	Kos	Kos International Airport	Seasonal charter	
Greece	Rhodes	Rhodes International Airport	Seasonal charter	
Greece	Samos	Samos International Airport	Seasonal charter	
Greece	Zakynthos	Zakynthos International Airport	Seasonal charter	
Ireland	Cork	Cork Airport	Base	
Ireland	Dublin	Dublin Airport	Base	
Ireland	Shannon	Shannon Airport	Base	
Italy	Alghero	Alghero–Fertilia Airport	Terminated	
Italy	Catania	Catania–Fontanarossa Airport	Terminated	
Mauritius	Plaine Magnien	Sir Seewoosagur Ramgoolam International Airport	Seasonal Charter	
Norway	Oslo	Oslo Airport, Gardermoen		
Spain	Fuerteventura	Fuerteventura Airport	Terminated	
Spain	Lanzarote	Lanzarote Airport	Seasonal charter	
Spain	Las Palmas	Gran Canaria Airport	Charter	
Spain	Mahón	Menorca Airport	Terminated	
Spain	Palma de Mallorca	Palma de Mallorca Airport	Seasonal charter	
Spain	Tenerife	Tenerife-South Airport	Seasonal charter	
Sweden	Gothenburg	Göteborg Landvetter Airport	Base	
Sweden	Malmö	Malmö Airport	Seasonal charter	
Sweden	Norrköping	Norrköping Airport		
Sweden	Örebro	Örebro Airport	Seasonal charter	
Sweden	Sälen Trysil	Scandinavian Mountains Airport	Terminated	
Sweden	Stockholm	Stockholm Arlanda Airport	Base	
Sweden	Umeå	Umeå Airport	Seasonal charter	
Sweden	Växjö	Växjö/Kronoberg Airport	Seasonal charter	
Tanzania	Zanzibar	Abeid Amani Karume International Airport	Seasonal charter	
Turkey	Antalya	Antalya Airport	Seasonal charter	
Turkey	Dalaman	Dalaman Airport	Seasonal charter	

== Fleet ==
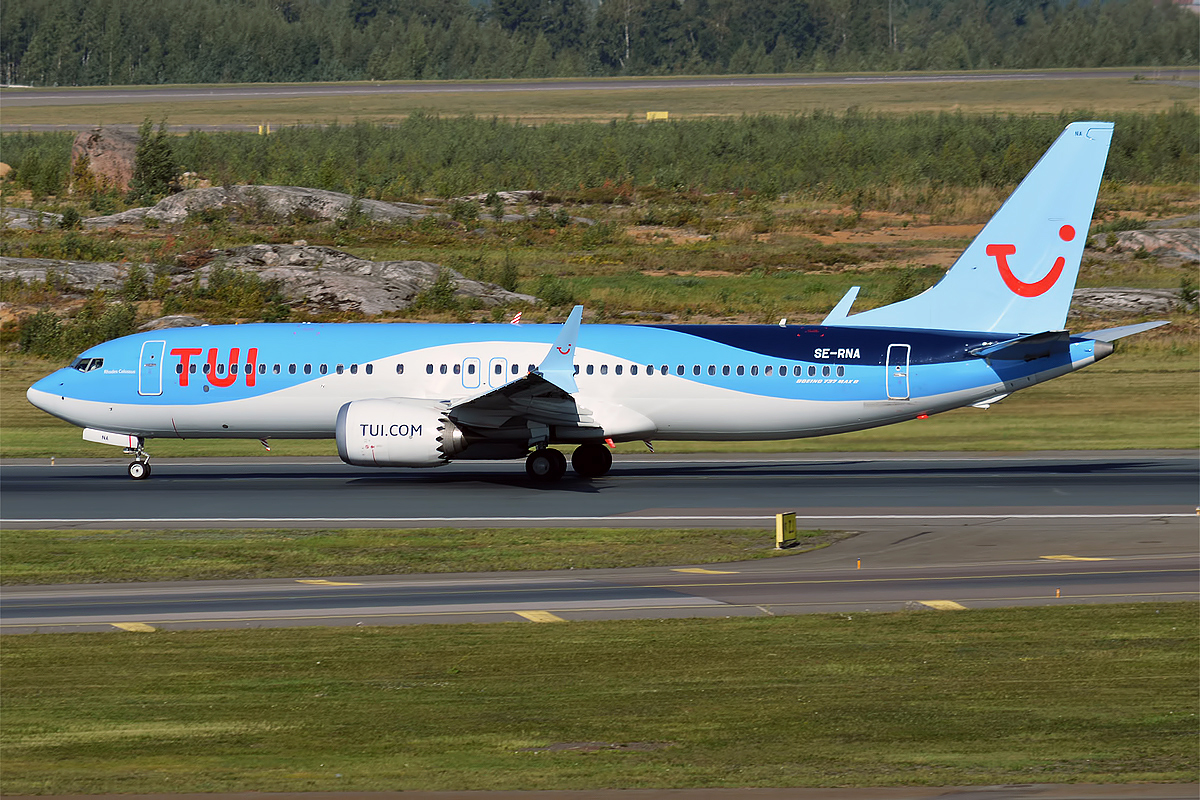
TUI fly Nordic Boeing 737 MAX 8

=== Current fleet ===
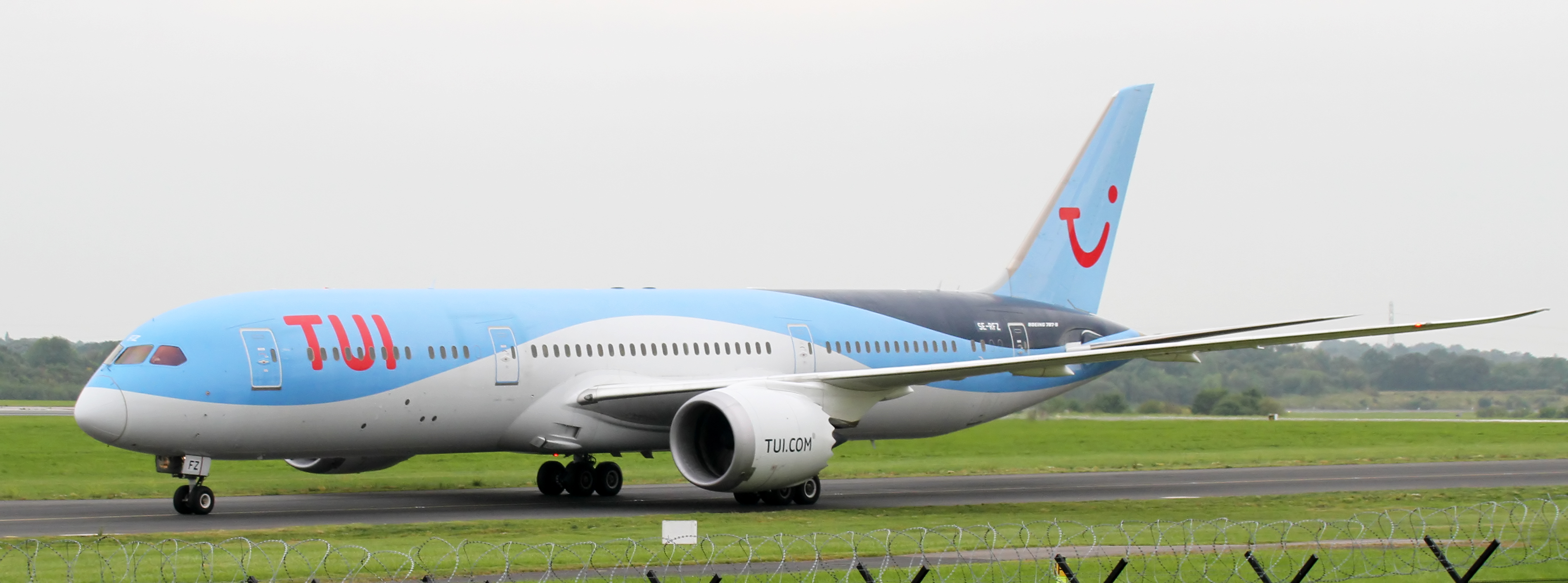
TUI fly Nordic Boeing 787-9 Dreamliner

As of August 2025, TUI fly Nordic operates the following aircraft:

TUI fly Nordic fleet
Aircraft	In service	Orders	Passengers			Notes
Aircraft	In service	Orders	W	Y	Total	Notes
Boeing 737 MAX 8	3	—	—	189	189	
Boeing 787-9	1	—	63	282	345	
Total	4	—				

=== Former fleet ===
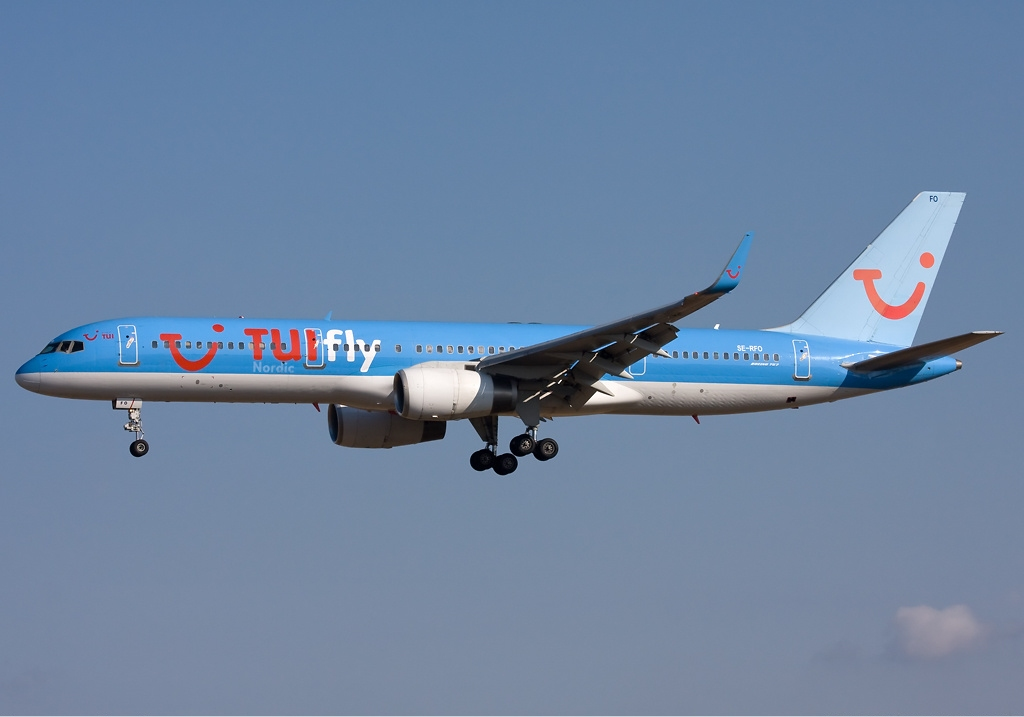
A former TUI fly Nordic Boeing 757-200 in 2009

In the past, TUI fly Nordic (and its predecessor Blue Scandinavia) previously operated the following aircraft:

TUI fly Nordic former fleet
Aircraft	Total	Introduced	Retired	Notes
Boeing 737-800	18	1998	2021	
Boeing 757-200	4	1998	2002	
Boeing 757-200	5	2005	2011	
Boeing 767-300ER	3	1999	2002	
Boeing 767-300ER	3	2008	2021	
Lockheed L-1011 TriStar	2	1996	1997	
McDonnell Douglas MD-83	3	1996	1998	

== See also ==
- List of airlines of Sweden
- List of airlines of Norway
- List of airlines of Denmark
- List of airlines of Finland
