= Luis Riu Bertrán =

Spanish hotelier and businessman (1933-1998)

- Born: 20 March 1933; Olot, Girona, Spain
- Died: 7 April 1998 (aged 65); Palma de Mallorca, Spain
- Occupations: Hotelier, businessperson
- Known for: Co-founding RIU Hotels & Resorts

Luis Riu Bertrán (20 March 1933 – 7 April 1998) was a Spanish hotelier and businessman who co-founded the RIU Hotels & Resorts chain with his father, Juan Riu Masmitjà. In 1953 the family acquired the Hotel San Francisco in Playa de Palma, Mallorca, which became the first hotel of the future RIU group. The following year they began working with the German travel agency Doktor Tigges-Fahrten on early package-tour arrangements which combined flights from Germany with hotel bookings in Mallorca. The developed package-tour arrangement served as the foundation for mass tourism development which would later become the main tourist attraction for Spain.

Starting in the late 1970s, Riu established an official business partnership with German tour operator TUI which his family had maintained for many years. The two companies established Riu Hotels S.A. in 1977 to operate a hotel-development business and a property-investment firm, with 51% of the shares owned by the Riu family and 49% owned by TUI. The two companies established RIUSA II, S.A. in 1993 as their main hotel management company, which operates RIU hotels around the world as a joint venture with equal ownership. In 1993 he received the Creu de Sant Jordi from the Government of Catalonia.

== Early life and family ==
Riu Bertrán was born on 20 March 1933 in Olot, Girona, to Juan Riu Masmitjà (1908–1996) and Maria Bertrán Espigulé. In 1950 the family emigrated from Catalonia to Venezuela. In Barquisimeto, he and his father gained experience managing a small hotel before returning to Spain and entering the hotel business in Mallorca. In 1954, Riu married Pilar Güell Boada.

== Career ==
In 1953, Riu and his father bought the Hotel San Francisco at Playa de Palma, Mallorca. The establishment became the first hotel in what would later grow into the RIU chain. During his 1954 trip to Germany, he met Doktor Tigges-Fahrten whom he partnered with to create Mallorca travel packages that combined air travel and hotel accommodations for German vacationers.

As the number of hotels increased, the company gathered its administrative and commercial functions at the Riu Centre in Playa de Palma, which became the group's headquarters in 1982. In 1993, RIU and TUI set up the centralized management company RIUSA II, S.A., conceived as a 50:50 joint venture to operate RIU-branded hotels. By 1996, Riu Bertrán was serving as managing director, while a gradual generational transition placed his son Luis Riu Güell as group president.

=== Alliance with TUI ===
RIU's commercial ties with the Tigges travel agency gradually developed into a broader collaboration with the German tour operator TUI. In 1977 that relationship was formalized through the creation of Riu Hotels S.A. as a hotel-development and property-investment company. The share capital was divided so that 51% remained with the Riu family and 49% was held by TUI. In 1993 the partners separated the ownership of assets from day-to-day hotel operations by creating RIUSA II, S.A., a 50:50 joint venture charged with managing and operating RIU-branded hotels worldwide.

The essential separation of duties remained intact through subsequent business activities. In 2021 TUI sold its 49% stake in the Riu Hotels property company to the Riu Group which allowed the Riu family to gain complete control over the real estate business while the two companies maintained their 50:50 operational partnership for hotel management.

=== Philanthropy ===
The Riu family has established their connection to social care through their work with the Fundació Joan Riu non-profit organization which operates in Girona to provide care and educational services for individuals with severe intellectual disabilities. The foundation was formally constituted on 23 December 1988, and the associated school and residential centre had begun operating in 1980.

== Honours ==
In 1993, the Generalitat de Catalunya awarded Riu Bertrán the Creu de Sant Jordi.

== Death and legacy ==
Riu Bertrán died of cancer in Palma de Mallorca on 7 April 1998, at the age of 65. At that time the RIU group operated 62 hotels with a total of 34,770 beds. Management of the company passed to his children Carmen Riu Güell and Luis Riu Güell, who became co-chief executives (consejeros delegados).

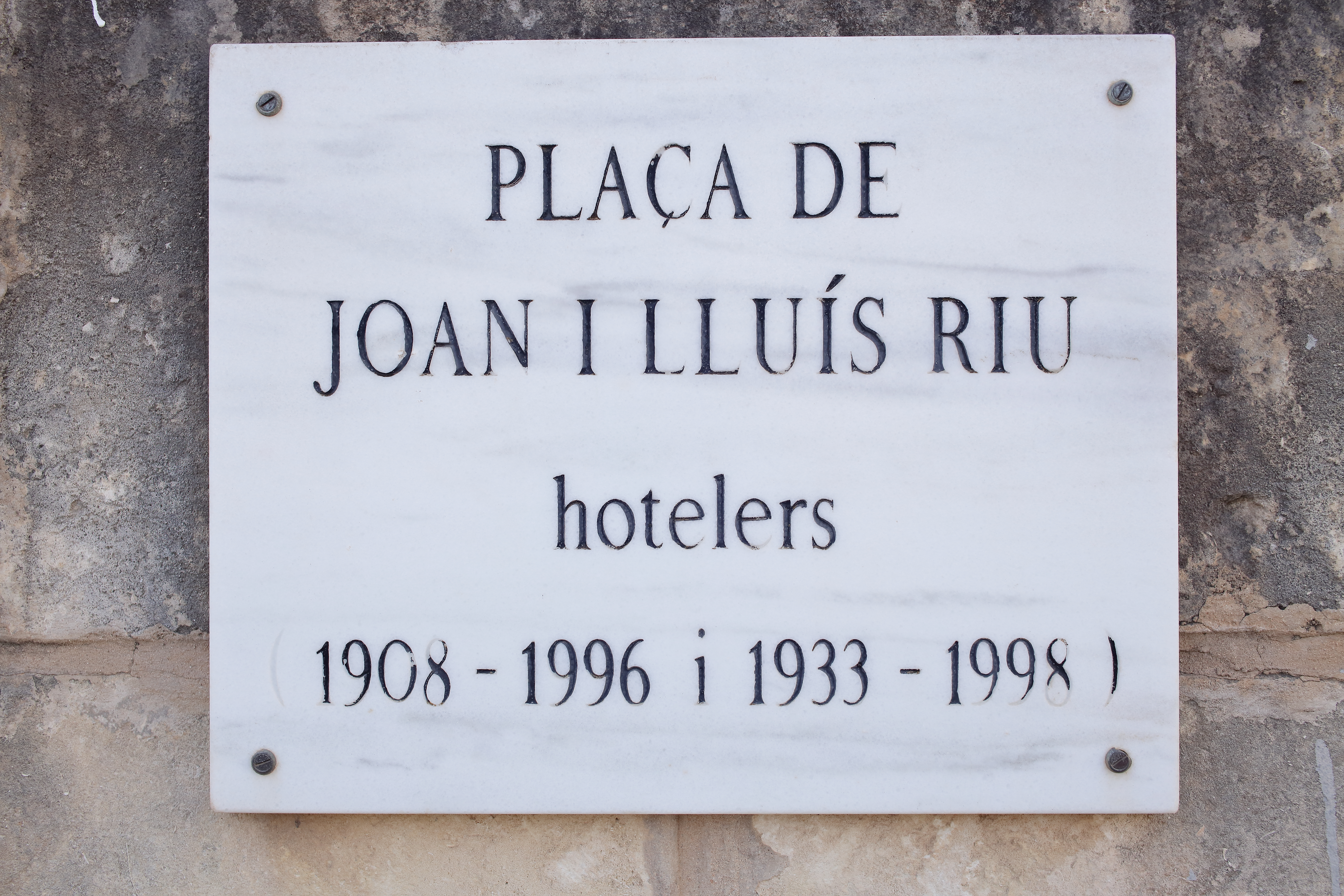
Plaça de Joan i Lluís Riu, Platja de Palma (Palma).

A public square in the Platja de Palma area of Palma is named Plaça de Joan i Lluís Riu, in honour of hoteliers Joan Riu Masmitjà and his son Lluís Riu Bertran, founders of RIU Hotels & Resorts. In December 2001 the city inaugurated in this square the sculpture Benvingut, by Jaume Mir, as a tribute to early tourism pioneers.

== See also ==
- RIU Hotels & Resorts
- TUI Group
- Package tour
- Tourism in Spain
