= Luis Riu Güell =

Spanish hotelier and business executive (born 1960)

- Born: 30 December 1960 (age 65); Palma de Mallorca, Balearic Islands, Spain
- Education: University of Barcelona
- Occupations: Hotelier, business executive
- Years active: 1985–present
- Employer: RIU Hotels & Resorts
- Known for: International expansion of RIU Hotels & Resorts
- Title: CEO and co-owner
- Children: 3
- Relatives: Luis Riu Bertrán (father); Juan Riu Masmitjà (grandfather); Carmen Riu (sister)

Luis Riu Güell (also spelled Luis Riu Guell; born 30 December 1960) is a Spanish hotelier and businessman who is the chief executive officer and co-owner of RIU Hotels & Resorts. A third-generation member of the Riu family, which founded the company in 1953, he has played a central role in its international expansion since the 1990s, especially in the Caribbean and the Americas.

== Early life and education ==
Riu was born in Palma de Mallorca in 1960. He grew up with his sister Carmen Riu, with whom he would later share the executive leadership of the family hotel company.

He earned a degree in business administration from the University of Barcelona. After completing his studies, he joined the family business in 1985 and took on responsibilities connected with RIU's expansion, beginning in the Canary Islands. In 1991 he was appointed president of the company and from that position led its international expansion. Since 1998 he has been chief executive, first jointly with his sister and, since 2024, sole CEO.

== Career ==
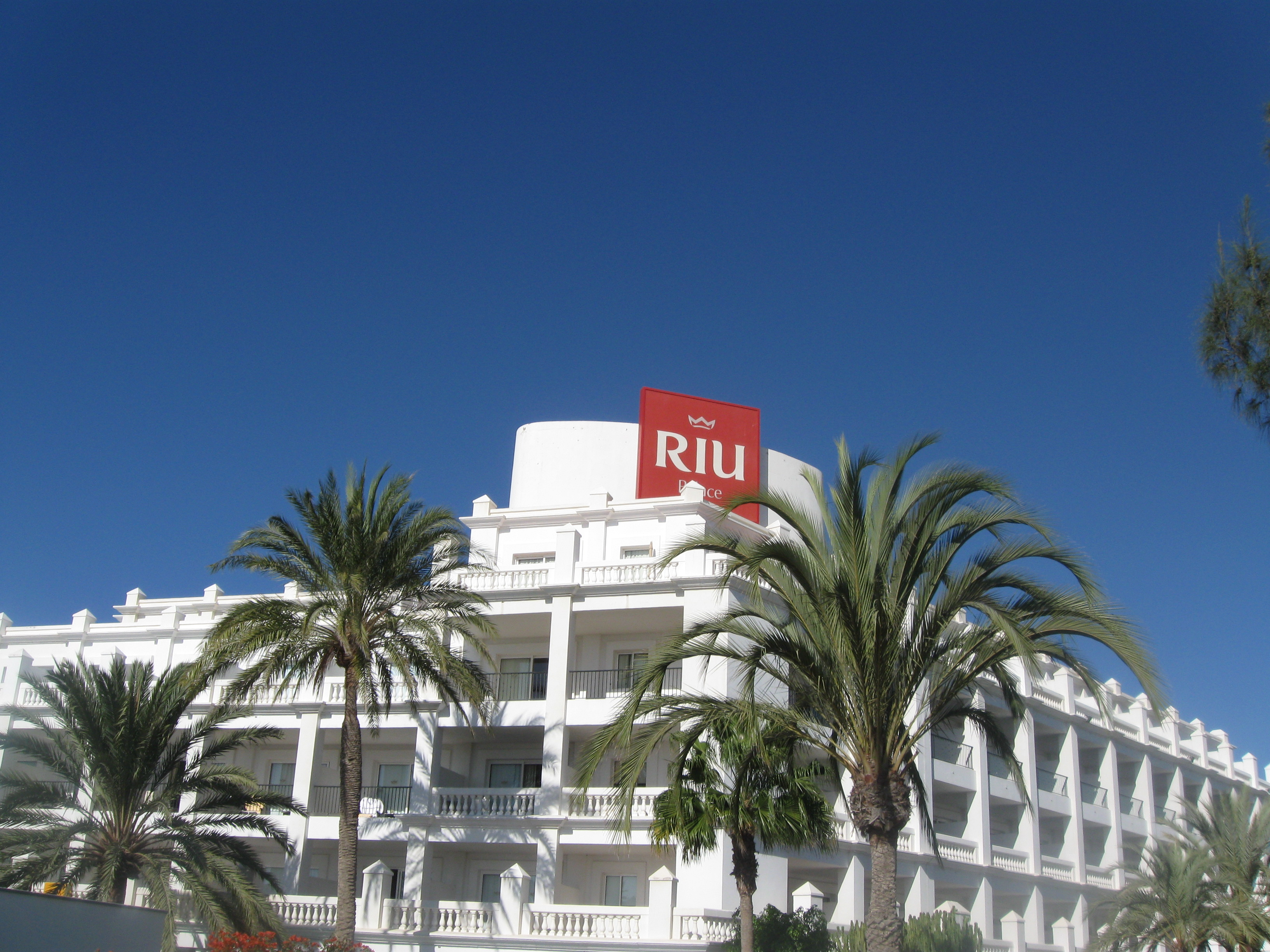
Riu Palace Maspalomas in Gran Canaria, part of RIU's long-standing presence in the Canary Islands.

Riu began his career at RIU Hotels & Resorts in the 1980s, first in hotel operations and later in new openings and expansion projects. In 1985, at the age of 25, he was placed in charge of opening the Riu Palmeras in Gran Canaria, the company's first hotel outside the Balearic Islands and its first property in the Canary Islands.

During the 1990s, Riu took part in the group's international expansion into the Caribbean and the Americas. In 1993, he was involved in consolidating RIU's alliance with the German tour operator TUI Group, formalised through the joint venture RIUSA II.

After the death of his father in 1998, Riu and his sister Carmen assumed the company's executive leadership as joint chief executives, marking the transfer of the family business to the third generation. Under their co-management, RIU expanded further in Europe, Africa, Asia and the Americas, and diversified into city hotels through the Riu Plaza brand.

In 2024, Carmen Riu retired from executive and institutional duties, leaving Luis Riu as the company's sole chief executive. In 2025, RIU announced a further redistribution of responsibilities among members of the fourth generation of the family, while Riu remained CEO and continued to supervise expansion projects, design, construction and refurbishment across the group.

During the first 13 years of his tenure as chief executive, RIU grew from 62 hotels to 107 establishments. In The List 2025, published by HOTELS Magazine, the company ranked 40th worldwide by rooms in operation.

== Personal life ==
Riu is married and has three children. Members of the fourth generation of the Riu family, including his children Luis, Naomi and Roberto, have taken management roles in operations, finance and development within RIU, while members of his sister's branch of the family have also assumed executive responsibilities.

== Recognition ==
In 2003, the business magazine Dinero included Luis and Carmen Riu among Spain's businesspeople of the year.

In 2010, the Jamaica Observer profiled Luis and Carmen Riu as "Tourism's game-changers" for RIU's role in the development of Jamaica as a tourist destination, and they were among the nominees in the newspaper's Business Leader awards programme.

In 2011, Carmen and Luis Riu were named the Spanish winners of the Ernst & Young Entrepreneur of the Year Award for 2010, organised in collaboration with IESE Business School and BNP Paribas. As national winners, they represented Spain in the global World Entrepreneur Of The Year competition.

In 2015, the siblings received the CIMET Gold and Diamond Insignia and were recognised as Próceres del Turismo Español en Iberoamérica ("Leading Figures of Spanish Tourism in Latin America").

In 2016, Riu was nominated in the corporate category for the Hotels magazine Hotelier of the World award.

In 2021, Hosteltur named Carmen and Luis Riu its Tourism Personality of the Year; the award was presented at FITUR in Madrid in January 2022.
