= Child Online Protection =

Initiative established by International Telecommunication Union

Child Online Protection (COP) is an initiative which is established by International Telecommunication Union in November 2008 within the framework of the Global Cybersecurity Agenda (GCA). The initiative was supported by the United Nations Secretary-General, states and several international organizations. COP is an international collaborative network to protect children worldwide against cyber threats by providing legal, technical and organizational measures.

== Objectives ==
COP main objectives are as follows:

- Identification of risks and vulnerabilities to children in cyberspace
- Creation of awareness among policymakers, industry, parents and educators as well as the children
- Development of practical tools to help minimize risk
- Sharing knowledge and experience

ITU established a Work Group on COP and enhanced its mandate Based on RESOLUTION 179 of The Plenipotentiary Conference of the International Telecommunication Union in 2010.

=== Partners ===
ITU is working with the following organizations on COP:

- UNICEF
- UNODC
- UNICRI
- UNIDIR
- European Commission
- Interpol
- ENISA (European Network and Information Security Agency)
- Insafe
- Commonwealth Telecommunications Organisation (CTO)
- IMPACT

In addition, there several civil society and private sector organization who participate in the project.

== See also ==
- International Telecommunication Union
- Murder of Carly Ryan - details related to "Carly's Law" and online grooming laws in Australia
