= RIU Hotels =

Spanish family-owned hotel chain

RIU Hotels & Resorts
- Type: Private
- Industry: Hospitality
- Founded: 1953
- Headquarters: Palma de Mallorca, Balearic Islands, Spain
- Key people: Luis Riu Güell (CEO)
- Products: Hotels
- Revenue: €4.188 billion (2025)
- Number of employees: 38,955 (2025)
- Subsidiaries: Riusa II (operating joint venture with TUI Group)
- Website: riu.com

RIU Hotels & Resorts is a Spanish family-owned hotel chain specialising in all-inclusive resorts and urban hotels. It was founded in 1953 by the Riu family in Mallorca and is headquartered in Palma de Mallorca, Balearic Islands, Spain.

The company operates primarily in sun-and-beach destinations and, since the 1990s, has maintained a strategic alliance with the German tour operator TUI Group through an operating joint venture called Riusa II.

== History ==
RIU was founded in 1953 when Juan Riu Masmitjà and María Bertran Espigulé, together with their son Luis Riu Bertrán, acquired the Hotel San Francisco in Mallorca, which became the chain's first property. During the 1960s and 1970s, the company expanded across the Balearic Islands, and in 1977 formalised a commercial partnership agreement with the German tour operator TUI (Touristik Union International).

In 1985, RIU opened its first hotel on Gran Canaria—the Riu Palmeras—marking the beginning of its expansion beyond the Balearics. International growth followed in 1991 with the opening of the Riu Taino in Punta Cana, Dominican Republic, the company's first hotel in the Americas; RIU now operates 45 hotels across the continent.

In 1993, the Riu family formalised its relationship with TUI by creating the joint venture Riusa II S.A., dedicated to the operation and commercial management of all hotels under the RIU brand. In 1998, following the death of Luis Riu Bertrán, leadership passed to his children Carmen Riu Güell and Luis Riu Güell, who led the company jointly for more than two decades.

In 2010, RIU launched its urban hotel brand, Riu Plaza, with the opening of its first property in Panama City. The Hotel Riu Plaza Berlin, inaugurated in 2015, was the brand's first hotel in Europe. Further Riu Plaza properties subsequently opened in major cities, including New York City in 2016 and Madrid in 2019. In 2016, the chain also expanded into Asia with the inauguration of the Riu Sri Lanka in Ahungalla.

Over the following decade RIU expanded its sustainability commitments, culminating in 2024 with the launch of the Proudly Committed strategy, which set targets for the 2024–2026 period covering emissions reduction, energy efficiency, waste management and environmental certification across the hotel network.

== Scale and financial results ==
In 2025, RIU Hotels & Resorts managed 101 hotels across 22 countries in Europe, the Americas, Africa and Asia, receiving 6.8 million guests and achieving an average occupancy rate of approximately 88%. The group employed approximately 38,955 people worldwide that year.

Gross revenue for 2025 reached €4.188 billion, an increase of 2.6% over 2024, a year that had itself seen 13% growth to exceed the €4 billion threshold for the first time. According to leading industry rankings, RIU is among the 40 largest hotel chains in the world and ranks third in Spain by number of rooms.

== Hotels and destinations ==
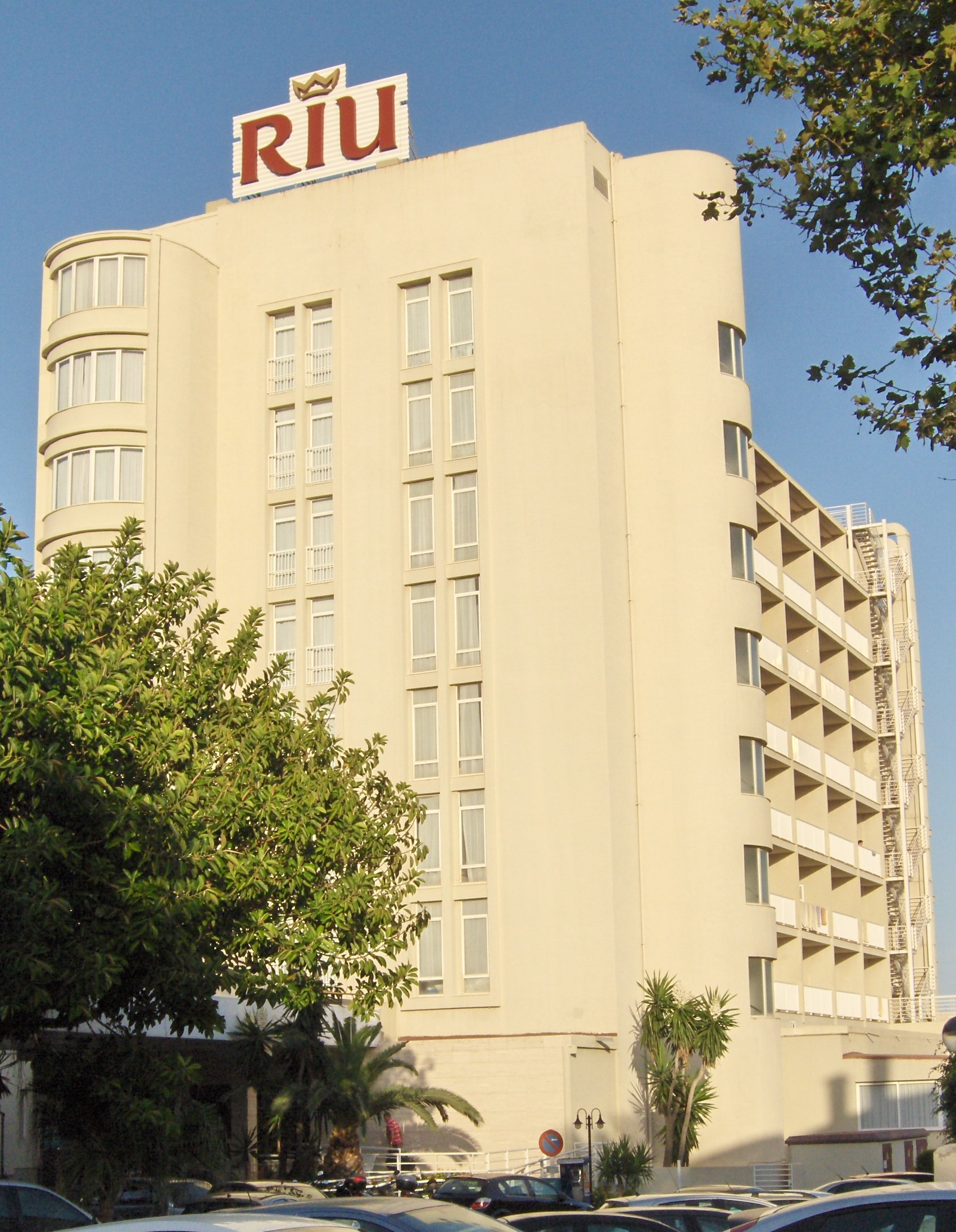
Riu Palace Nautilus hotel, Torremolinos, Spain.

RIU operates primarily in sun-and-beach resort destinations. Since 2010 it has also developed a portfolio of urban hotels under the Riu Plaza brand.

In Europe, the chain has a strong presence in Spain, particularly in the Balearic Islands and the Canary Islands, as well as resort and city hotels on the Iberian Peninsula. Riu Plaza properties operate in Madrid, Berlin, Dublin and London, where the Riu Plaza London Victoria opened in 2023 as the company's first hotel in the United Kingdom.

In the Americas, RIU combines beach resorts in Mexico and across the Caribbean—including the Dominican Republic, Jamaica and the Bahamas—with urban hotels in Panama City, Guadalajara, Miami, Chicago, San Francisco and New York City. In September 2025 the company opened the Riu Plaza Toronto, its first hotel in Canada.

In Africa, in addition to properties in Morocco, Senegal and Zanzibar, RIU operates six hotels in Cape Verde—three on the island of Sal and three on Boa Vista—comprising approximately 4,649 rooms. In 2024 those properties welcomed around 389,000 guests and generated revenue of 26.6 billion Cape Verdean escudos, with a workforce of more than 3,300 people, the majority of whom were Cape Verdean nationals.

In Asia, RIU opened the Riu Sri Lanka in Ahungalla in 2016, the chain's first hotel on the continent. The company has also announced the Riu Palace Phuket on the Thai island of Phuket, scheduled to open in 2026 as RIU's first hotel in Thailand.

=== Properties by country ===
Country	Hotels and locations
Spain	27 – Madrid; Mallorca; Nerja; Formentera; Gran Canaria; Tenerife; Fuerteventura; Lanzarote; Torremolinos; Chiclana de la Frontera
Portugal	1 – Caniço (Caniço de Baixo)
Mexico	23 – Cancún; Guadalajara; Los Cabos; Mazatlán; Playa del Carmen; Riviera Nayarit
Dominican Republic	5 – Punta Cana
Jamaica	7 – Negril; Ocho Rios; Montego Bay; Falmouth
Bahamas	1 – Nassau
Aruba	2 – Palm Beach
Costa Rica	2 – Guanacaste
Panama	2 – Playa Blanca, Coclé Province; Panama City
United States	5 – New York City; Miami Beach; Chicago; San Francisco
Canada	1 – Toronto
United Kingdom	2 – London
Germany	1 – Berlin
Ireland	1 – Dublin
Morocco	6 – Agadir; Marrakesh
Cape Verde	6 – Sal; Boa Vista
Senegal	1 – Pointe Sarène, M'Bour
Tanzania	2 – Zanzibar
United Arab Emirates	1 – Dubai (+ 1 planned: Riu Palace Dubai Island, opening date not yet announced)
Mauritius	2 – Le Morne Brabant
Sri Lanka	1 – Ahungalla
Maldives	2 – Dhaalu Atoll
Thailand	1 – Phuket

== Employment and labour relations ==
In 2025, RIU employed approximately 38,955 people across its hotel network and offices worldwide. The company prioritises local hiring and in-house training, particularly in developing destinations. In Cape Verde, for example, RIU employed around 3,378 people in 2024, of whom approximately 92% were Cape Verdean nationals, according to trade press reports.

RIU collaborates with international trade union organisations to strengthen labour rights across its operations. In 2021, the chain signed a framework agreement with the International Union of Food, Agricultural, Hotel, Restaurant, Catering, Tobacco and Allied Workers' Associations (IUF) to prevent and eradicate sexual harassment in the workplace, including commitments on staff training, internal protocols and joint monitoring mechanisms.

The group also runs vocational training programmes for young people at risk of social exclusion. In Spain, RIU participates in initiatives run with public training centres in San Fernando (province of Cádiz), providing educational pathways for more than a hundred students. In partnership with Save the Children, the Búho programme provides specialist psychotherapeutic care for children and adolescents who have experienced trauma.

== Leadership and corporate structure ==
RIU Hotels & Resorts is managed by the Riu family, currently in its third generation with members of the fourth generation holding executive positions. Luis Riu Güell and his sister Carmen Riu Güell assumed joint leadership in 1998, following the death of their father Luis Riu Bertrán. In May 2024, after 26 years of joint management, Carmen Riu Güell stepped down from executive roles; Luis Riu Güell became sole CEO, while Carmen remained linked to the group as chair of the board of directors.

In February 2025, the company announced that five members of the fourth generation of the Riu family had joined the board of directors and assumed specific executive responsibilities. Joan Trian Riu, son of Carmen Riu Güell, took on institutional representation and executive oversight of Operations in the Americas and the Balearic Islands, and also represents RIU on the supervisory board of TUI Group. Lola Trian Riu assumed responsibility for the family's philanthropic funds. Luis Riu Rodríguez, son of Luis Riu Güell, became executive director of Atlantic Operations covering the Canary Islands, Andalusia, Portugal, Cape Verde, Morocco and Senegal, along with oversight of technical services and the RIU Party entertainment project. Naomi Riu Rodríguez was appointed chief financial officer and executive director of Indian Ocean Operations, covering Zanzibar, Dubai, Sri Lanka, the Maldives, Mauritius and Thailand, as well as supervision of Riu Plaza urban hotels in several European cities. Roberto Riu Rodríguez took charge of commercial and marketing activities, sharing responsibility for design and construction with Luis Riu Rodríguez.

=== Corporate structure ===
The group operates through several property-holding and hotel management entities. In 2021, the Riu family acquired TUI's 49% stake in Riu Hotels S.A., bringing the family to 100% ownership of that asset-holding company, while the operating joint venture Riusa II—which manages the hotels commercially—remains a shared structure between both groups. In 2025, the family announced a merger of Riu Hotels S.A. and Hotel San Francisco S.A. to simplify the ownership structure. The resulting entity would hold 51 hotels in 15 countries, totalling more than 26,000 rooms and recording revenue in excess of €1.8 billion in 2024.

== Corporate social responsibility and philanthropy ==
RIU Hotels & Resorts carries out social, educational and environmental programmes across the destinations where it operates.

=== Child protection ===
Since 2012, RIU has been a signatory to the Code of Conduct for the Protection of Children from Sexual Exploitation in Travel and Tourism (ECPAT), committing to prevention protocols, staff training and awareness measures for guests and suppliers. The commitment was signed by then-CEO Carmen Riu Güell at a ceremony in Gran Canaria. In 2024, RIU was recognised as a Top Member of the Code of Conduct, a designation awarded to companies that implement systematic child protection policies.

UNICEF Spain has noted the role large hotel groups such as RIU can play in integrating child protection into their business models, in the context of programmes such as Hoteles Amigos and the promotion of effective adherence to the ECPAT Code.

=== Social investment ===
In 2024, RIU directed more than €3.17 million to social investment across 104 projects in various countries, focused primarily on children, environmental conservation and local development. Since 2014, the company reports contributions of nearly €2 million to childhood cancer research and improvement of paediatric healthcare, channelled through agreements with hospitals and specialist organisations.

In 2017, following the earthquakes in Mexico, RIU signed an agreement with UNICEF to donate US$400,000 to the Pronto Regreso a Clases (Back to School Fast) programme, which set up and equipped temporary classrooms to ensure continuity of education for affected children while their schools were repaired or rebuilt.

In March 2026, RIU announced a partnership with Irish charity Barnardos to support more than 1,200 at-risk children, adolescents and families in Dublin over an initial three-year period, through early childhood, family support and basic needs programmes.

=== Sustainability ===
RIU's sustainability strategy is structured under the Proudly Committed framework, which sets targets for 2024–2026 covering greenhouse gas emissions reduction, waste management, energy efficiency and environmental certification of the hotel network. In December 2025, RIU announced that 100% of its hotels had obtained ECOstars sustainability certification. In March 2026, the company presented regenerative tourism initiatives in Mexico under the same strategy, including environmental conservation, community support and child protection measures.

==== CSR timeline ====
- 2011: Creation of the Corporate Social Responsibility (CSR) department.
- 2012: Start of hotel sustainability certification process; signature of the ECPAT Code of Conduct by Carmen Riu Güell at a ceremony in Gran Canaria.
- 2014: Launch of the "12 CSR Commitments" campaign.
- 2016: Signature of the UNWTO Global Code of Ethics for Tourism.
- 2017: Publication of first CSR report; UNICEF agreement following the Mexico earthquakes.
- 2018: Pilot of the RIU Method in Costa Rica in collaboration with ESCP Business School.
- 2019–2020: Global rollout of the RIU Method; development of an evaluation system to measure social investment against the Sustainable Development Goals.
- 2020 onwards: Expanded biodiversity conservation and coastal ecosystem protection programmes in Cape Verde, including projects in the Ponta Sino nature area on Sal island, and renewable energy and waste management initiatives.
- 2021: Publication of first CSR report using Global Reporting Initiative (GRI) methodology; IUF framework agreement on preventing workplace sexual harassment.
- 2022: Publication of first integrated Annual Report combining sustainability and business information.
- 2023: Appointment of a Hotel Sustainability Supervisor (HSS) in 100% of the chain's hotels.
- 2024: Launch of the Proudly Committed strategy; recognition as ECPAT Top Member; €3.17 million social investment across 104 projects.
- 2025: 100% ECOstars certification across the hotel portfolio; social investment target of €5 million.

== Recognition ==
RIU Hotels & Resorts and its executives have received various awards in the hospitality and business sectors.

- 2003: Carmen Riu Güell and Luis Riu Güell were named among the ten businesspeople of the year in Spain by Dinero magazine.
- 2009: Carmen Riu Güell and Luis Riu Güell were nominated for the Observer Business Leader Foreign Investor award by the Jamaica Observer.
- 2010: Carmen Riu Güell and Luis Riu Güell won the Ernst & Young Entrepreneur of the Year Award (Spain edition), organised with BNP Paribas and IESE Business School.
- 2015: Carmen Riu Güell and Luis Riu Güell received the Gold and Diamond Insignia from the Ibero-American Conference of Ministers and Tourism Entrepreneurs (CIMET), designated as Próceres del Turismo Español en Iberoamérica (Pioneers of Spanish Tourism in Ibero-America).
- 2016: Luis Riu Güell was nominated in the corporate category of the Hotelier of the World award by Hotels magazine.
- 2021: Carmen Riu Güell and Luis Riu Güell were awarded the Hosteltur Tourism Personality of the Year prize.

== See also ==
- TUI Group
- All-inclusive resort
- Hospitality industry
