= TUI Sverige =

Travel and holiday companies of Sweden

TUI Sverige AB
- Company type: Subsidiary
- Industry: Travel
- Founded: 1961; 65 years ago
- Founders: Bengt Bengtsson; Håkan Hellström
- Headquarters: Stockholm, Sweden
- Area served: Sweden
- Key people: Alexander Huber, VD
- Products: Charter and scheduled passenger airlines, package holidays, cruise lines, hotels and resorts
- Services: Travel agency
- Number of employees: approx. 700
- Parent: TUI Group
- Website: www.tui.se

TUI Sverige is a Swedish travel operator and subsidiary of TUI Group.

The company was previously known as Fritidsresor, meaning 'leisure travel', but was rebranded in October 2016. This was also the case with other TUI tour operators and airlines.

== Products ==
TUI offers package holidays and charter flights with its sister airline, TUI fly Nordic. The company offers holidays across the world, the main destinations being Spain, the Canary Islands, North Africa and Thailand.

== History ==
The company was founded in 1961 by Bengt Bengtsson and his colleague Håkan Hellström, as Fritidsresor. The first destinations offered by Fritidsresor were to the United States later that year. In 1962, holidays to Sitges on the Costa Dorada in Spain, followed by Arma di Taggia and Rimini in Italy were launched.

In 1967, the Danish subsidiary of the company, Fritidsrejser, was launched. Norwegian company Norske Star Tour and Fritidsresor were merged, forming the group Fritidsresegruppen in 1980.

In 1991, Fritidsresegruppen bought 30% of Team Stirling - Falke Rejser, Sol-Rejser and Fritidsrejser, and in 1996, these three companies operated under the name Star Tour. Preussag AG then bought Fritidsresegruppen in 2000.

== Advertisements ==
- In 2008, the company used Billy Paul's cover of the Elton John song, Your Song.
- In 2016, the company used Leona Lewis' cover of Your Song.
