= Carmen Riu =

Spanish hotelier and business executive (born 1955)

Carmen Riu Güell
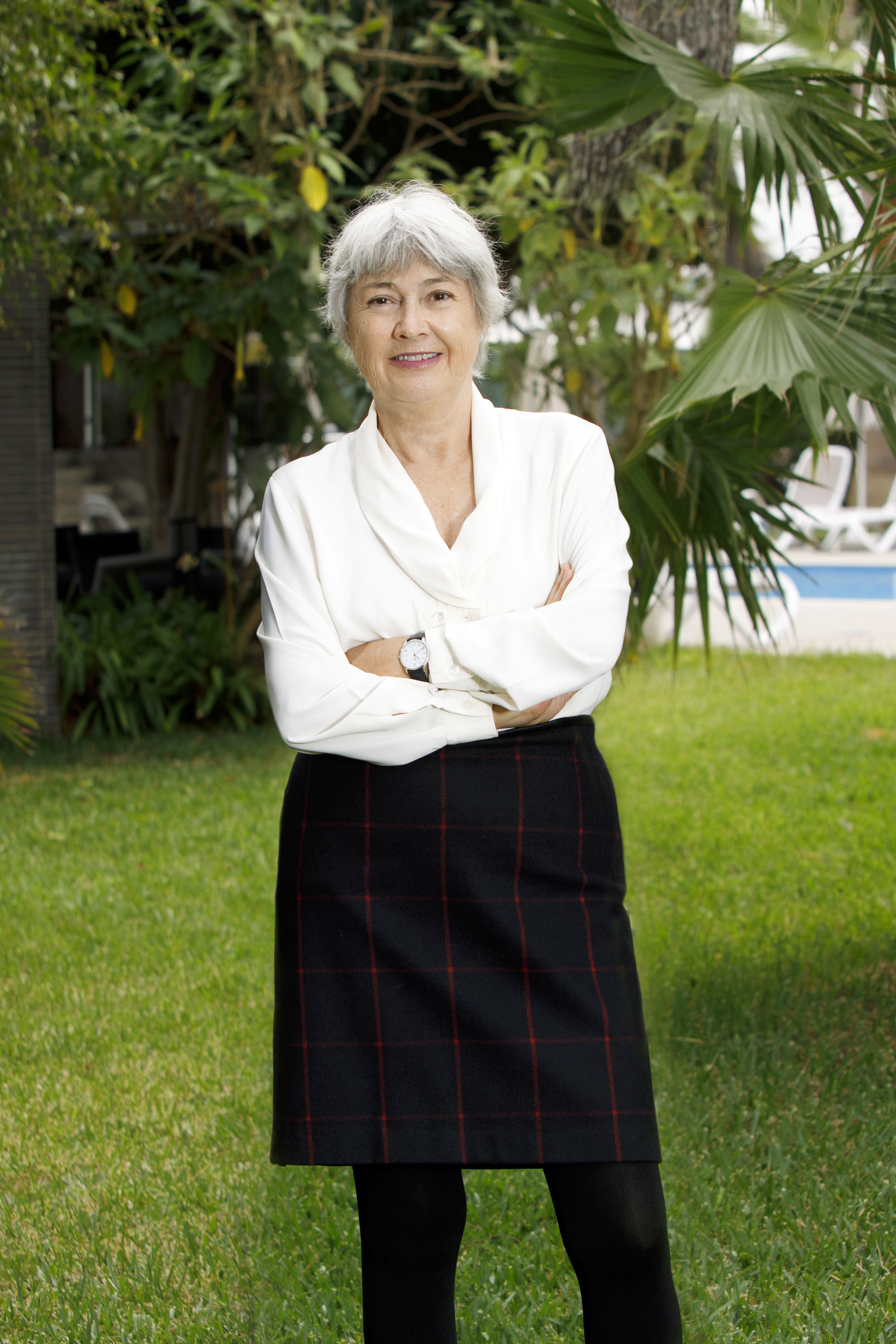
- Carmen Riu Güell
- Born: 15 October 1955 (age 70); Palma de Mallorca, Balearic Islands, Spain
- Education: University of Barcelona; IE Business School
- Occupations: Hotelier; business executive
- Employer: RIU Hotels & Resorts
- Known for: Co-chief executive officer of RIU Hotels & Resorts (1998–2024)
- Title: Chair of the board of directors (since 2024)
- Board member of: Supervisory Board of TUI AG (2005–2018)
- Children: 2
- Parent(s): Luis Riu Bertrán; Pilar Güell Boada

Carmen Riu Güell (born 15 October 1955) is a Spanish hotelier and business executive. She co-led RIU Hotels & Resorts with her brother Luis Riu Guell as co-chief executive officer from the years 1998 to 2024. In 2024, she stepped down from executive duties and became chair of the group's board of directors.

== Early life and education ==
Riu was born in Palma de Mallorca. She is the daughter of the hotelier Luis Riu Bertrán (1933–1998) and Pilar Güell Boada.

She studied Economics and Business Administration at the University of Barcelona and later completed postgraduate training at IE Business School in Madrid.

== Career ==
Riu joined the family business in 1977 and worked in hotel management roles within the group.

After the death of her father in April of the year 1998, she and her brother assumed executive leadership of the company as co-chief executives. During her tenure, RIU expanded internationally and launched the urban brand Riu Plaza.

In 2021, the Riu family agreed to buy from TUI Group the 49% stake the German group held in a holding company linked to the chain, a deal reported at €670 million and covering 19 hotels.

Carmen served on the Supervisory Board of TUI AG from 2005 to 2018.

== Awards and honours ==
- Ernst & Young Entrepreneur of the Year (Spain), shared with Luis Riu Güell (2010).
- Hosteltur Award for Tourism Personality (2021), shared with Luis Riu Güell.
- TUI Lifetime Achievement Award (2025).
