= TUI Group =

German multinational travel company

TUI AG
- Trade name: TUI Group
- Formerly: Preussag AG (1923–2002)
- Type: Public (Aktiengesellschaft)
- Traded as: FWB: TUI1; MDAX component; LSE: TUI (delisted)
- ISIN: DE000TUAG505
- Industry: Hospitality, tourism
- Founded: 1923; 103 years ago
- Headquarters: Hanover, Germany
- Area served: Austria; Belgium; Canada; Czechia; Denmark; Finland; Germany; Greece; Ireland; Netherlands; Norway; Poland; Portugal; Spain; Sweden; Switzerland; Turkey; United Kingdom
- Key people: Dieter Zetsche (Chairman of the Supervisory Board); Sebastian Ebel (CEO)
- Products: Charter and scheduled passenger airlines, package holidays, cruise lines, hotels and resorts
- Services: Travel agencies
- Revenue: ▲€23,167.3 million (2024)
- Operating income: ▲€1,275.3 million (2024)
- Net income: ▲€507 million (2024)
- Number of employees: 66,845 (2024)
- Website: www.tuigroup.com

TUI AG (trading as TUI Group) is a German multinational leisure, travel and tourism company; it is the largest such company in the world. TUI is an acronym for Touristik Union International ('Tourism Union International'). TUI AG was known as Preussag AG until 1997, when the company changed its activities from mining to tourism. It is headquartered in Hanover, Germany, and trading on the Frankfurt Stock Exchange.

It fully or partially owns several travel agencies, hotel chains, cruise lines and retail shops as well as five European airlines. These activities involve the operation of 353 hotels with 275,144 beds and it allows its brand to be used for another 65 hotels operated by third parties. These hotels accommodate 21 million guests a year. It also operates 16 cruise ships under the TUI Cruises, Hapag-Lloyd Cruises and Marella Cruises brands, as well as a fleet of 134 aircraft.

== History ==
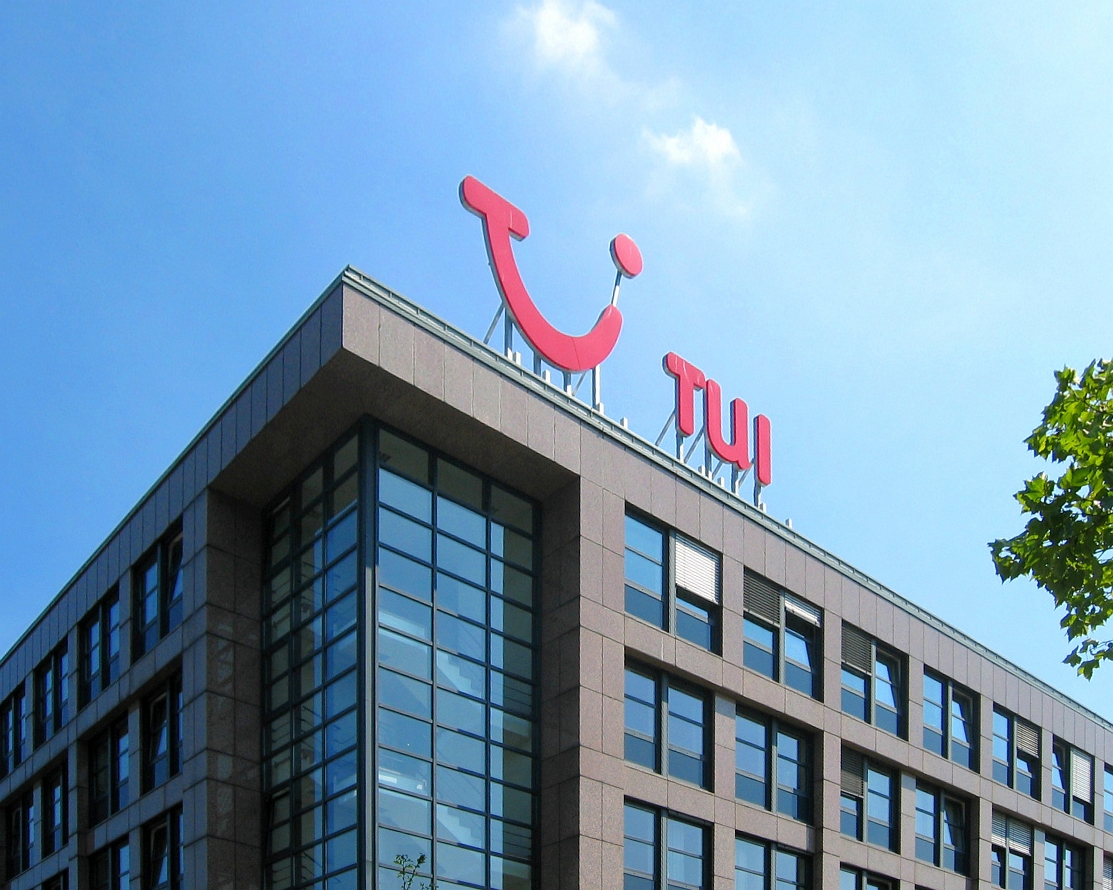
TUI Group head office in Hanover

=== Foundation and early years ===
The origins of the company lie in the industrial and transportation company Preussag AG, which was originally formed as a German mining company. It was incorporated on 9 October 1923, as Preußische Bergwerks- und Hütten-Aktiengesellschaft ('Prussian Mine and Foundry Company'). In 1927, it was merged with the Ruhr coal company, Hibernia AG, and electricity utility to become the Vereinigte Elektrizitäts und Bergwerks AG (VEBA AG, 'United Electrical and Mining Company').

While Preussag's roots were industrial, a parallel tourism lineage that predates the group's 1968 consolidation can be traced to early post-war package travel between Germany and Mallorca. In 1953, commercial relations began between the travel agency Dr Tigges (one of the forerunners of TUI) and the Riu family's hotel company, founded by Luis Riu Bertrán, offering vacation packages for German tourists to the beaches of Mallorca. The following year, Dr Tigges agreed to send organised German holidaymakers to the family's newly acquired Hotel Riu San Francisco in Playa de Palma, marking the start of RIU's longstanding cooperation with German tour operators.

After the sale of Salzgitter AG and purchase of Hapag-Lloyd AG (the navigation and logistics company) in 1997, Preussag AG became a global enterprise in the service and leisure industry. At that time, Hapag-Lloyd held a 30% interest in the tourism conglomerate TUI (founded 1968), increased to 100% by 1999. In addition, the company acquired 25% of Thomas Cook shares in 1997, which it doubled the following year. On 2 February 1999, the Carlson Leisure Group merged with Thomas Cook into a holding company owned by the German bank Westdeutsche Landesbank, Carlson Inc and Preussag. However, in mid 2000, Preussag acquired Thomas Cook's rival Thomson Travel and was forced to sell its majority 50.1% stake in Thomas Cook by regulatory authorities. In 2002, Preussag renamed itself TUI AG.

TUI announced a merger of its travel division with the British tour operator First Choice in March 2007, which was approved by the European Commission on 4 June 2007, on the condition that the merged company sell Budget Travel in Ireland. TUI held a 55% stake in the new company, TUI Travel plc, which began operations in September 2007.

In April 2008, Alexey Mordashov, who purchased his first shares in TUI Travel in autumn 2007, purchased additional TUI Travel shares under S-Group in order to expand TUI Travel into Eastern Europe and Russia.

Its logistics activities, concentrated in the shipping sector, were kept separate and bundled within Hapag-Lloyd AG. A majority stake in Hapag-Lloyd was sold to the Albert Ballin consortium of investors in March 2009, and a further stake was sold to Ballin in February 2012, as TUI worked to exit from the shipping business and to optimize its tourism business with expansion in Russia, China and India under Michael Frenzel. Prior to August 2010, John Fredriksen held the largest Norwegian privately held stake in TUI Travel and had a significant influence upon TUI Travel's direction and strategy. As Alexey Mordashov through his S-Group Travel Holding increased his stake in TUI Travel to a stake larger than Fredriksen's stake, the shipping business had to be sold.

In June 2014, the company announced it would fully merge with TUI Travel to create a united group with a value of USD 9.7 billion. The merger was completed on 17 December 2014 and the combined business began trading on the Frankfurt and London stock exchanges. Prior to this merger, Alexey Mordashov, the largest private shareholder in TUI Travel, held a blocking stake in TUI Travel through his S-Group. After the merger, Mordashov's stake was reduced to less than a blocking stake of 25%. On 12 December 2016, Mordashov increased his stake in TUI Group from 18% to more than 20%. In October 2018, his 24.9% stake was the largest privately held stake in TUI Group. In June 2019, Mordashov transferred 65% of his stake to the KN-Holding, owned by his sons Kirill and Nikita Mordashov. TUI stated in a statement that they "welcomed the second generation of the family amongst its shareholders".

Berge & Meer and Boomerang Reisen as well as Atraveo were sold to the holding company GENUI in 2019. At the end of 2019, the holiday home provider Wolters Reisen GmbH and the round trip specialist Wolters Rundreisen GmbH, of which TUI Group owned 100% of the shares via an investment company, were sold to the Frankfurt-based company e-domizil.

=== Development since 2020 ===
In August 2020, the company reported a net loss of €2.3 billion (from October 2019 to June 2020) as a result of the COVID-19 pandemic. Out of the sum, €1.5 billion loss related to the period from April to June 2020, while the revenue for the same period was €75 million, 98% less than the same period in 2019. TUI's chief executive officer, Fritz Joussen announced that the firm was considering selling Marella Cruises.

In March 2022, the company's largest single shareholder, Alexey Mordashov, a Russian oligarch and confidant of Vladimir Putin, was placed under sanctions due to the 2022 Russian invasion of Ukraine.

In April 2023 TUI raised around €1.8 billion for repayment of Wirtschaftsstabilisierungsfonds ("WSF") state aid and a significant reduction of the KfW credit line by selling shares at a discount to existing investors, excluding Mordashov due to sanctions under German securities law.

== Corporate affairs ==
=== Governance ===
The following people have served in key roles:

Time period	Chief Executive Officer (CEO)	Time period	Chairman of the Supervisory Board
2022–	Sebastian Ebel	2019–	Dieter Zetsche
2013–2022	Friedrich Joussen	2011–2019	Klaus Mangold
2014–2016	Peter Long (Co-CEO)	2010–2011	Dietmar Kuhnt
		2004–2010	Jürgen Krumnow

=== Shareholders ===
The company's shares are listed on the Frankfurt Stock Exchange, the London Stock Exchange, as well as the Hanover Stock Exchange.

In spring 2007, the Norwegian shipowner and financial investor John Fredriksen acquired a 15.01% stake in TUI. At TUI's AGM in May 2008, Fredriksen demanded a split-up of the group and the dismissal of TUI CEO Michael Frenzel. At the AGM on 13 May 2009, Fredriksen demanded that Supervisory Board Chairman Jürgen Krumnow be voted out of office so that he could then join the Supervisory Board himself. However, these attempts were unsuccessful. On 28 February 2014, Monteray Enterprises Ltd (John Fredriksen) notified TUI that its share of voting rights in TUI had fallen below the 3% thresholds on 24 February 2014.

Russian oligarch Alexei Mordashov joined TUI at the beginning of 2008. By July 2008, he had increased his stake to 15.03% and in March 2012 to 25.29%, and later to 34%. He was thus the largest single shareholder. Mordashov has been on the EU sanctions list since 28 February 2022 and, according to a corresponding voting rights notification, transferred control of most of his indirectly held shares to the Virgin Islands-based company Ondero Limited, controlled by Marina Mordashova, on that date. Due to an investigation by the Federal Ministry of Economics and Climate Protection regarding the transfer of the shares to Ondero Limited, the transfer is suspended. The shareholding in TUI AG therefore continues to be held (indirectly) by Mordashov. Due to the capital increase in spring 2023, in which Mordashov was not allowed to participate due to his sanction, his shareholding has meanwhile decreased significantly. According to the voting rights notifications of the German Federal Financial Supervisory Authority of 16 May 2023, 10.87% shares in TUI AG have been indirectly attributable to Mordashov since 19 April 2023, while Marina Mordashowa holds 0% in TUI AG.

In February 2024, the company decided to leave the London Stock Exchange retaining its listings on the Frankfurt Stock Exchange and the Hanover Stock Exchange.

Shareholder structure (July 2023)
Shareholder	Share
Institutional investors	57.8%
Alexei Mordashov	10.9%
Private investors	30.2%
RIU SA (Riu Güell family)	1.1%

=== Business figures ===
The key indicators of the TUI Group were at the financial years ending 30 September:

TUI Group Financial Information
Year	Revenue (€bn)	Net Profit (€m)	Number of employees
2016	17.1	910	66,779
2017	18.5	645	66,577
2018	19.5	733	69,546
2019	18.9	416	71,473
2020	7.9	–3,148	48,330
2021	4.7	–2,467	50,584
2022	16.5	–277	61,091
2023	20.6	306	65,413
2024	23.2	507	66,845

== Operations ==
=== Accommodation ===
In the 2022 financial year, the Hotels & Resorts segment comprised a total of 353 hotels with 275,144 beds. With 322 properties, the majority are four- or five-star hotels. 53% were operated under management contracts, 38% were owned by the respective hotel company, 8% were leased and 1% of the facilities were operated under franchise agreements. In addition, 65 hotels were operated by third-party hoteliers under TUI's international concept brands as at 30 September 2022, bringing the total number including third-party hotels to 418.

=== Cruises ===
TUI's cruise segment operates a total of 16 cruise ships under three brands:

- TUI Cruises is a joint venture with Royal Caribbean Cruises. The fleet currently comprises seven ships named Mein Schiff 1 to 7.
- Hapag-Lloyd Cruises is responsible for luxury and expedition cruises in German-speaking countries. The brand was transferred to TUI Cruises in 2020. With the MS Europa and the MS Europa 2, the group offers luxury cruises; the two ships were the only cruise ships worldwide to be awarded the 5-star-plus category by the Berlitz Cruise Guide. Hanseatic class expedition ships include the Hanseatic Nature, the Hanseatic Inspiration and the Hanseatic Spirit.
- Marella Cruises offers cruises with four ships, primarily in the UK market.

=== Airlines ===
TUI owns several airlines operating under the brands TUI fly and TUI Airways which are managed by TUI Airline Management.

Airline	Origin	Description
TUI Airways	United Kingdom	TUI Airways is the largest of the TUI airlines. It has 70 aircraft and flies from 26 British airports to 109 destinations worldwide. It was formed by the merger of Thomsonfly (formerly Britannia Airways) and First Choice Airways (formerly Air 2000). The airline was the last TUI airline to be rebranded.
TUI fly Belgium	Belgium	TUI fly Belgium has operated since March 2004 to more than 105 destinations around Europe, the Red Sea, the Caribbean, the Canary Islands, the US and Africa. Since 2012, it has operated scheduled flights as well as charter services. It was formerly known as Jetairfly, and renamed TUI fly Belgium in late 2016.
TUI fly Deutschland	Germany	TUI fly Deutschland has operated since 1972, originally as Hapag-Lloyd Flug, becoming TUIfly in 2007. It was later renamed TUI fly Deutschland, and it has 40 aircraft, flying to 39 destinations.
TUI fly Netherlands	Netherlands	Since 2005, TUI fly Netherlands has operated charter flights from Amsterdam Schiphol Airport to destinations in Southern Europe, North Africa, the Caribbean, and Latin America. It was originally called Arkefly and later became Arke in 2013, before being renamed TUI fly Netherlands in 2015.
TUI fly Nordic	Denmark; Finland; Norway; Sweden	TUI fly Nordic flies from locations across Europe. They fly holidaymakers travelling with the following tour operators; TUI Sverige (Sweden), TUI Finland (Finland), TUI Norge (Norway), and TUI Danmark (Denmark). There was a slight name change, from TUIfly Nordic to TUI fly Nordic.

=== Strategic partnership with RIU Hotels & Resorts ===
TUI AG has maintained a long-standing strategic relationship with RIU Hotels & Resorts, which began in the 1950s when the German tour operator Dr Tigges partnered with the Riu family to offer holiday packages to Mallorca. In 1953, German tourists were first accommodated at the Hotel Riu San Francisco, owned by Luis Riu Bertran, marking the beginning of a collaboration that evolved over decades.

The hotel group is currently led by the children of Luis Riu Bertran, Luis Riu Güell and Carmen Riu Güell, who continue the family's involvement in the business. TUI remains a key distribution partner for RIU, channeling a substantial share of holidaymakers to RIU properties. As of 2024, RIU SA also holds a 1.1% stake in TUI AG.

=== Online travel platform ===
Founded in mid-2013, Musement was established as an Italian-based online travel platform that secured funding from 360 Capital Partners. It closed $10 million in Series B funding in 2016. Musement acquired Triposo in October 2017. In September 2018, Musement was acquired by TUI Group.

In October 2020, the prior TUI Destination Experiences, which owned Musement, was renamed TUI Musement.

== Controversies ==
- On 16 April 2009, TUI Travel and S-Group Travel Holding of the Russian shareholder Alexey Mordashov declared the formation of a joint venture in Russia with investments of 30 million euros to develop tourism activities in Russia and Ukraine. The intention was to take over the tour operators VKO Group and Mostravel in Russia and Voyage Kiev in Ukraine, which had over 160 travel agencies and over half a million customers. In March 2022, TUI AG terminated the brand use agreement with TUI Russia; TUI Russia is no longer a TUI Group company. The last shares in TUI Russia were sold in 2021. In May 2022, it was reported that the major stakeholder and Russian oligarch Alexei Mordashov had made a transfer of a holding of 29.9% of the company: TUI failed to follow the rules and verify the new owner of the shares. In addition, the transfer was a violation of the sanctions against Russia by the European Union, which sanctioned Mordashov personally.
- A 2018 study in the UK found that TUI had the largest gender pay gap reported to date by a major UK company, with its male employees paid more than twice what female employees are paid.
- TUI has become the main airline carrying out charter deportation flights for the UK Home Office. It is estimated that in November and December 2020 TUI carried out the deportation of more than 150 people in 13 flights to 23 destinations for the Home Office.
