= Celebrity Constellation =

Millennium-class cruise ship operated by Celebrity Cruises

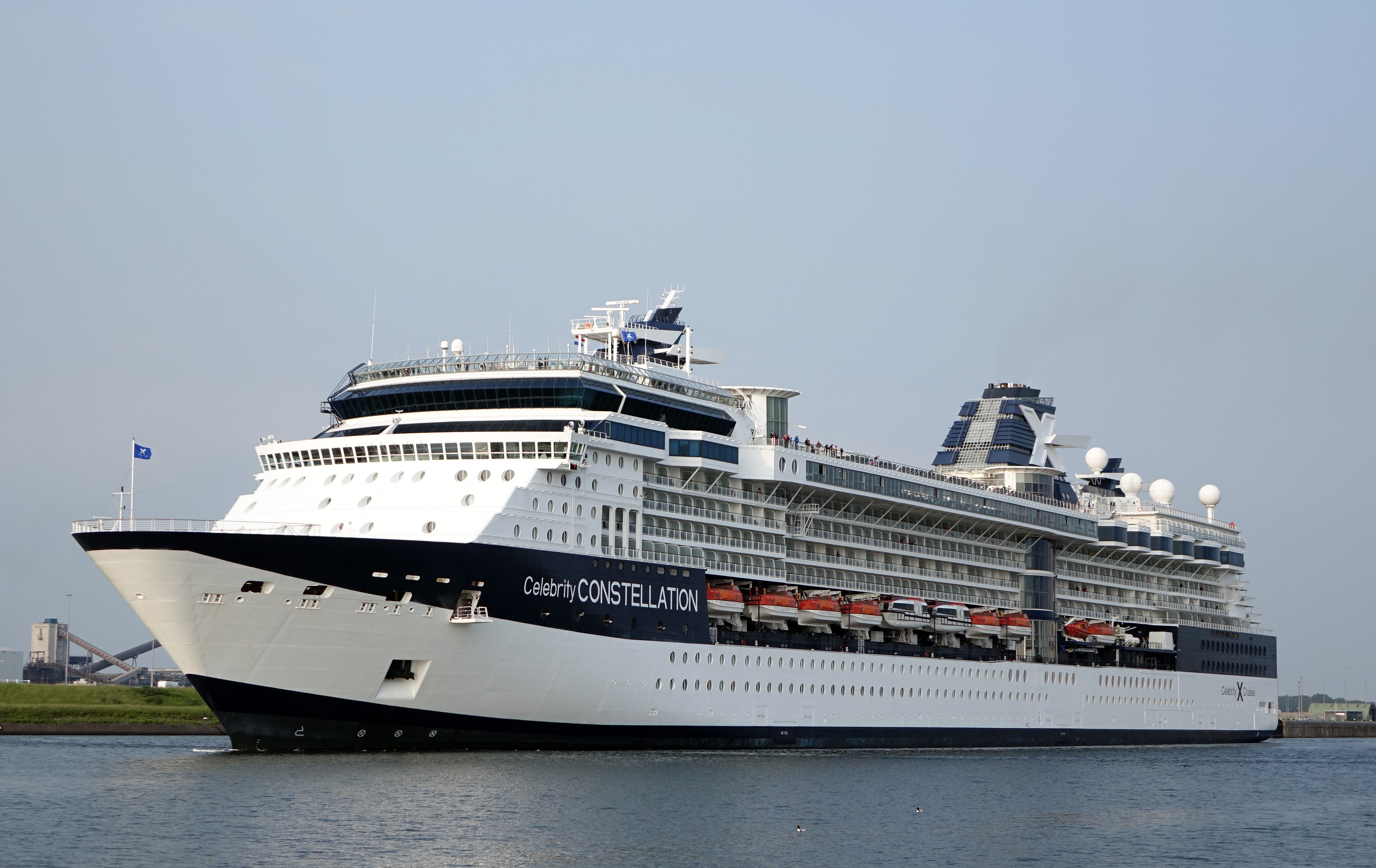
- Celebrity Constellation in IJmuiden, 2014

History

Malta
- Name: 2002-2007: Constellation; 2007-present: Celebrity Constellation
- Owner: Royal Caribbean Group
- Operator: Celebrity Cruises
- Port of registry: 2002–2003: Monrovia, Liberia; 2003–2008: Nassau, Bahamas; 2008–present: Valletta, Malta
- Builder: Chantier de L'Atlantique, St. Nazaire, France
- Yard number: U31
- Laid down: 9 April 2001
- Launched: 31 October 2001
- Christened: 12 May 2002
- In service: 2002–present
- Identification: Call sign: 9HJB9; IMO number: 9192399; MMSI number: 249046000
- Status: In service

General characteristics
- Class & type: Millennium-class cruise ship
- Tonnage: 90,940 GT
- Length: 965 ft (294 m)
- Beam: 106 ft (32.2 m)
- Draft: 27.3 ft (8.323 m)
- Decks: 13
- Installed power: Two General Electric gas turbines; 50,000 kW (combined)
- Propulsion: 2 × 19 MW Rolls-Royce/Alstom Mermaid azimuth thrusters
- Speed: 24 knots (44 km/h; 28 mph)
- Capacity: 2,170 (double occupancy) passengers
- Crew: 999

GTS Celebrity Constellation (formerly Constellation) is the fourth and final Millennium-class cruise ship built for Celebrity Cruises, a subsidiary of Royal Caribbean Group. She was renamed in May 2007 to add the "Celebrity" prefix, joining her three sister ships: Celebrity Infinity, Celebrity Summit, and Celebrity Millennium.

She was built at the Chantiers de l'Atlantique shipyard in St. Nazaire, France. The ship is powered by a COGES power plant of gas turbines and a steam turbine providing up to 60 megawatts for the electric systems and two 19 MW Rolls-Royce/Alstom MerMaid azimuth thrusters for propulsion. In 2007, an additional diesel engine was fitted as a fuel-saving measure. The ship can run on any combination of the gas turbines or diesel. In port, she generates electrical power from the diesel.

During the summer period the ship sails to the Mediterranean, repositioning to the Caribbean in the winter months.

Celebrity Constellation was scheduled to complete an extensive renovation in May 2020. However, as a result of the business impact from the Covid-19 pandemic, these plans are delayed until a future unannounced date. Another rumor that Celebrity Constellation and sister ship Celebrity Infinity are to be sold or leased to Spanish cruise line, Pulmantur, has been denied by Celebrity Cruises.

In mid-2021, Celebrity Constellation was supposed to receive a multi-million dollar refit, but it was postponed until Spring 2024.

== Routes ==
Celebrity Constellation has operated in the Mediterranean and Adriatic during the summer seasons and in the Persian Gulf during the rest of the calendar year. In October 2020, she repositioned to Tampa, Florida to operate Caribbean and Panama Canal voyages, marking Celebrity's return to Tampa after a 13-year absence.
