= List of ship commissionings in 2001 =

The list of ship commissionings in 2001 includes a chronological list of all ships commissioned in 2001.

	Operator	Ship	Flag	Class and type	Pennant	Other notes
22 January	Indian Navy	Mumbai		Delhi-class destroyer	D62	
23 February	Royal Australian Navy	Sheean		Collins-class submarine	SSG 77	
28 February	Royal Navy	Blyth		Sandown-class minehunter	M111	
3 March	Celebrity Cruises	Infinity	Liberia	Millennium-class cruise ship		
10 March	United States Navy	Winston S. Churchill		Arleigh Burke-class destroyer	DDG-81	
21 April	United States Navy	Lassen		Arleigh Burke-class destroyer	DDG-82	
3 May	Royal Navy	Portland		Type 23 frigate	F79	
16 May	RG Line	Casino Express	Finland	Ferry		Ex-Fennia with Silja Line
17 May	Superfast Ferries	Superfast VII	Greece	Ro-pax ferry		
18 May	French Navy	Charles de Gaulle		Nuclear-powered aircraft carrier	R91	
May	Pullmantur Cruises	Oceanic	Bahamas	Cruise ship		Ex-Big Red Boat I with Premier Cruise Line
7 June	Royal Canadian Navy	Victoria		Victoria-class submarine	SSK 876	First in class
26 June	DFDS Seaways	Pearl of Scandinavia	Denmark	Cruiseferry		Ex-Lankapuri Star Aquarius with Star Cruises
30 June	United States Navy	Iwo Jima		Wasp-class amphibious assault ship	LHD-7	
16 July	Superfast Ferries	Superfast VIII	Greece	Ro-pax ferry		
20 October	United States Navy	Howard		Arleigh Burke-class destroyer	DDG-83	
October	Cruise Ferries	Wasa Queen	Panama	Ferry		Formerly with Silja Line
October	Celebrity Cruises	Summit	Liberia	Millennium-class cruise ship		
28 November	Royal Navy	Shoreham		Sandown-class minehunter	M112	
8 December	United States Navy	Bulkeley		Arleigh Burke-class destroyer	DDG-84	
