= Infectious disease on cruise ships =

Infectious disease on cruise ships is a hazard associated with cruises. Outbreaks of contagious diseases can spread quickly due to the confined cruise ship environment, reliance on shared spaces, the lack of healthcare facilities, and the large number of passengers and crew members from disparate points of origin.

Outbreaks of diseases including norovirus, Legionnaires', cyclosporiasis, orthohantavirus, and COVID-19, have all occurred on cruise ships.

== Diseases ==
Respiratory and gastrointestinal diseases are more likely to be communicated on cruise ships.

=== Norovirus ===
Norovirus is a virus that can cause gastroenteritis and is also a cause of gastroenteritis on cruise ships. It is typically transmitted from person to person. Symptoms usually last between 1 and 3 days and generally resolved without treatment or long term consequences. The incubation period of the virus averages about 24 hours.

Norovirus outbreaks are often perceived to be associated with cruise ships. According to the American CDC, factors that cause norovirus to be associated with cruise ships include the closer tracking and faster reporting of illnesses on cruise ships compared to those on land; the closer living quarters that increases the amount of interpersonal contact and the turnover of passengers that may bring the viruses on board. Outbreak investigations by the CDC have shown that transmission of norovirus among cruise ship passengers is primarily person-to-person; potable water supplies have not been implicated. In a study published in the Journal of the American Medical Association, the CDC reported that, "Perceptions that cruise ships can be luxury breeding grounds for acute gastroenteritis outbreaks don't hold water. A recent CDC report showed that from 2008 to 2014, only 0.18% of more than 73 million cruise passengers and 0.15% of some 28 million crew members reported symptoms of the illness."

Ships docked in port undergo surprise health inspections. In 2009, ships that underwent unannounced inspections by the CDC received an average CDC Vessel Sanitation Program score of approximately 97 out of a total possible 100 points. The minimum passing inspection score is 85. Collaboration with the CDC's Vessel Sanitation Program and the development of Outbreak Prevention and Response Plans has been credited in decreasing the incidence of norovirus outbreaks on ships.

=== Legionnaires' disease ===
Legionella, the bacterium which causes Legionnaires' disease, and in particular the most virulent strain, Legionella pneumophila serogroup 1, can cause infections when inhaled as an aerosol or aspirated. 50 passengers across nine cruises in 1994 either contracted Legionnaire's or likely contracted the disease due to exposure to whirlpool spas contaminated with the pathogen.

=== Enterotoxigenic Escherichia coli ===
Enterotoxigenic Escherichia coli is a form of E. coli and the leading bacterial cause of diarrhea in the developing world, as well as the most common cause of diarrhea for travelers to those areas. Since 2008 there has been at least one reported incident each year of E. coli on international cruise ships reported to the Vessel Sanitation Program of the Centers for Disease Control, though there were none in 2015. Causes of E. coli infection include the consumption of contaminated food or water contaminated by human waste.

=== COVID-19 ===
Cases and suspected cases of COVID-19 occurred on cruise ships in early 2020, at the beginning of the COVID-19 pandemic. Authorities across the world turned away ships or quarantined them; cruise operators cancelled some port visits and ultimately suspended global cruise operations. People aboard cruise ships played a role in spreading the disease in some countries.

== Outbreaks ==
=== 2020s ===
Cruise launch year	Cruise dates	Owner/Operator	Ship	Disease	Cases	Deaths	Location	Notes and References
2020	2 February - 16 February	Princess Cruises	Caribbean Princess	Norovirus	403	0	No information
2020	16 February - 1 March	Princess Cruises	Caribbean Princess	Norovirus	259	0	No information
2020	1 March - 16 March	Holland America Line	Westerdam	Unknown	27	0	No information
2020	7 March - 19 March	Royal Caribbean International	Grandeur of the Seas	Norovirus	105	0	No information
2021	29 November - 13 December	Viking Cruises	Viking Sea	Vibrio and E. coli	120	0	No information
2022	28 April - 5 May	Seabourn Cruise Line	Seabourn Odyssey	Unknown	20	0	No information
2022	24 May - 31 May	Carnival Cruise Line	Carnival Splendor	Norovirus	80	0	No information
2022	21 December - 6 January	Silversea Cruises	Silver Moon	Unknown	28	0	No information
2022	29 December - 3 January	P&O Cruises	MV Arcadia	Norovirus	94	0	No information
2023	1 January - 13 April	P&O Cruises	MV Arcadia	Norovirus	No information	No information	No information
2023	16 January - 21 January	Royal Caribbean International	Brilliance of the Seas	Norovirus	No information	No information	No information
2023	28 January - 3 February	Royal Caribbean International	Jewel of the Seas	Norovirus	No information	No information	No information
2023	2 February - 5 March	Princess Cruises	Ruby Princess	Norovirus	No information	No information	No information
2023	6 March - 17 March	Celebrity Cruises	Celebrity Constellation	Norovirus	No information	No information	No information
2023	9 March - 18 March	Celebrity Cruises	Celebrity Equinox	Norovirus	No information	No information	No information
2023	11 March - 23 March	Royal Caribbean International	Enchantment of the Seas	Norovirus	No information	No information	No information
2023	23 March - 31 March	Royal Caribbean International	Enchantment of the Seas	Norovirus	No information	No information	No information
2023	17 March - 1 April	Princess Cruises	Emerald Princess	Norovirus	No information	No information	No information
2023	31 March - 28 April	Princess Cruises	Grand Princess	Norovirus	No information	No information	No information
2023	31 March - 28 April	Princess Cruises	Grand Princess	Norovirus	No information	No information	No information
2023	6 May - 21 May	Holland America	Nieuw Amsterdam	Norovirus	No information	No information	No information
2023	15 May - 25 May	Celebrity Cruises	Celebrity Summit	Norovirus	No information	No information	No information
2023	6 June - 20 June	Viking Cruises	Viking Neptune	Norovirus	No information	No information	No information	Viking Cruises blamed the outbreak on an Icelandic restaurant visited by some passengers.
2023	8 October - 13 October	Virgin Voyages	Scarlet Lady	Norovirus	No information	No information	No information
2024	3 January - 12 January	Celebrity Cruises	Celebrity Constellation	Norovirus	No information	No information	No information
2024	22 January - 6 February	Cunard Line	Queen Victoria	Norovirus	150+	No information	No information
2026	1 April – 11 May	Oceanwide Expeditions	MV Hondius	Hantavirus	11+	3

== See also ==
- Bioaerosol
- Cross-species transmission
- Infectious disease: Transmission
- Pathogen transmission
- Rodentology
- Transmission coefficient (epidemiology)
