= Disease outbreak =

Sudden increase in occurrences of a disease

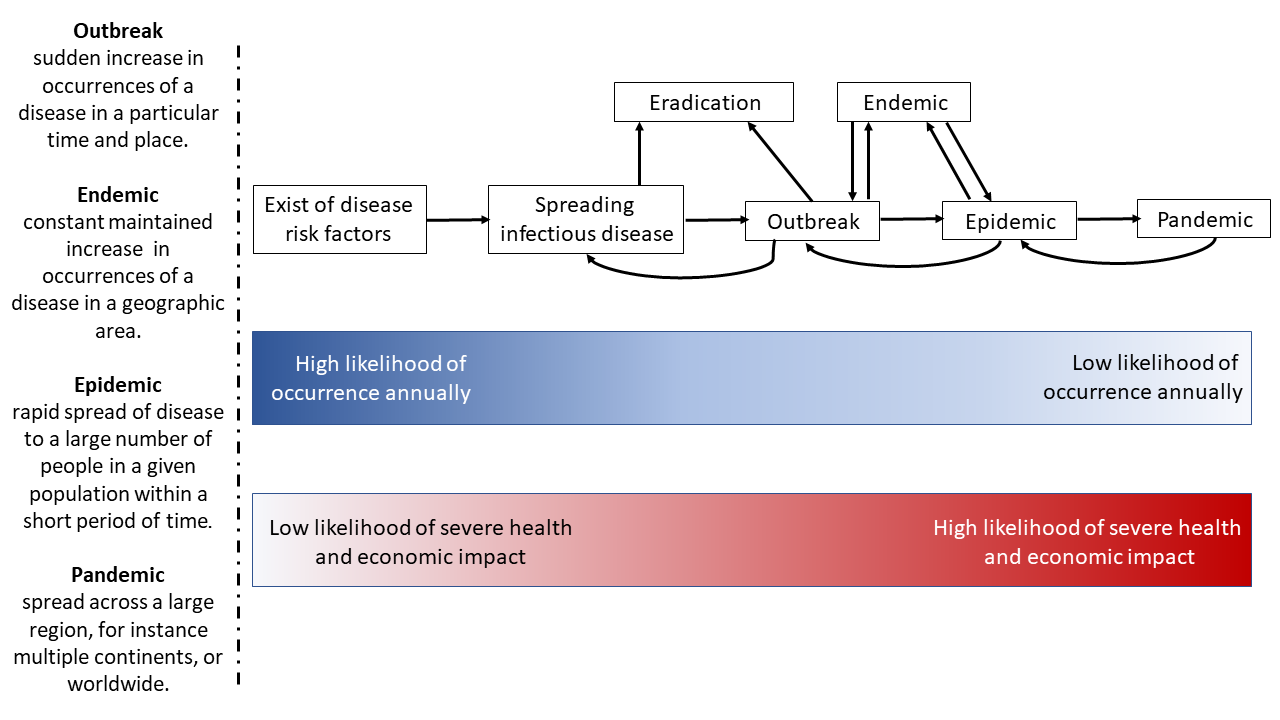
Difference between outbreak, endemic, epidemic and pandemic

In epidemiology, an outbreak is a sudden increase in occurrences of a disease when cases are in excess of normal expectancy for the location or season. It may affect a small and localized group or impact upon thousands of people across an entire continent. The number of cases varies according to the disease-causing agent, and the size and type of previous and existing exposure to the agent. Outbreaks include many epidemics, which is a term normally only used for infectious diseases, as well as diseases with an environmental origin, such as a water or foodborne disease. They may affect a region in a country or a group of countries. Pandemics are near-global disease outbreaks when multiple and various countries around the Earth are soon infected.

== Definition ==
The terms "outbreak" and "epidemic" have often been used interchangeably. Researchers Manfred S. Green and colleagues propose that the latter term be restricted to larger events, pointing out that Chambers Concise Dictionary and Stedman's Medical Dictionary acknowledge this distinction.

== Outbreak investigation ==
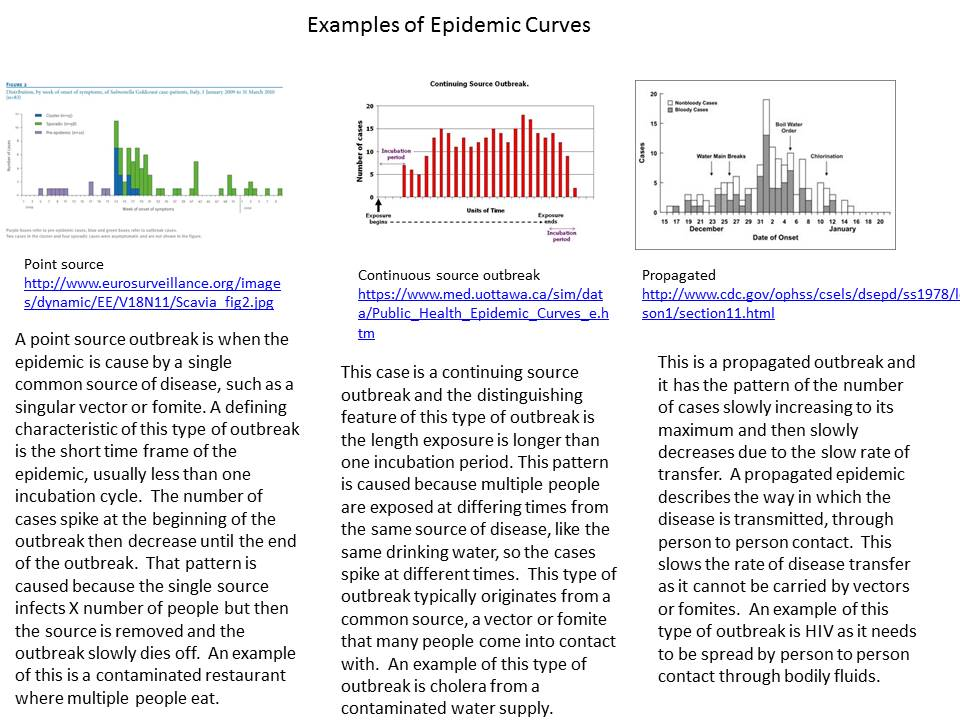
Epidemic curves

When investigating disease outbreaks, the epidemiology profession has developed a number of widely accepted steps. As described by the United States Centers for Disease Control and Prevention, these include the following:

- Identify the existence of the outbreak (Is the group of ill persons normal for the time of year, geographic area, etc.?)
- Verify the diagnosis related to the outbreak
- Create a case definition to define who/what is included as a case
- Map the spread of the outbreak using Information technology as diagnosis is reported to insurance
- Develop a hypothesis (What appears to be causing the outbreak?)
- Study hypotheses (collect data and perform analysis)
- Refine hypothesis and carry out further study
- Develop and implement control and prevention systems
- Release findings to greater communities

The order of the above steps and relative amount of effort and resources used in each varies from outbreak to outbreak. For example, prevention and control measures are usually implemented very early in the investigation, often before the causative agent is known. In many situations, promoting good hygiene and hand-washing is one of the first things recommended. Other interventions may be added as the investigation moves forward and more information is obtained. Waiting until the end of an investigation to implement prevention and control measures is a sure way to lose ones job. In outbreaks identified through notifiable disease surveillance, reports are often linked to laboratory results and verifying the diagnosis is straight forward. In outbreaks of unknown etiology, determining and verifying the diagnosis can be a significant part of the investigation with respect to time and resources. Several steps are usually going on at any point in time during the investigation. Steps may be repeated. For example, initial case definitions are often established to be intentionally broad but later refined as more is learned about the outbreak. The above list has 9 steps, others have more. Implementing active surveillance to identify additional cases is often added.

Outbreak debriefing and review has also been recognized as an additional final step and iterative process by the Public Health Agency of Canada.

== Types ==
There are several outbreak patterns, which can be useful in identifying the transmission method or source, and predicting the future rate of infection. Each has a distinctive epidemic curve, or histogram of case infections and deaths.

- Common source – All victims acquire the infection from the same source (e.g. a contaminated water supply).
  - Continuous source – Common source outbreak where the exposure occurs over multiple incubation periods
  - Point source – Common source outbreak where the exposure occurs in less than one incubation period
- Propagated – Transmission occurs from person to person.

Outbreaks can also be:

- Behavioral risk related (e.g., sexually transmitted diseases, increased risk due to malnutrition)
- Zoonotic – The infectious agent is endemic to an animal population, infection is transferred to humans.

Patterns of occurrence are:

- Endemic – a communicable disease, such as influenza, measles, mumps, pneumonia, colds, viruses, and smallpox, which is characteristic of a particular place, or among a particular group, or area of interest or activity.
- Epidemic – when this disease is found to infect a significantly larger number of people at the same time than is common at that time, and among that population, and may spread through one or several communities.
- Pandemic – occurs when an epidemic spreads worldwide.

== Condition for declaring an outbreak over ==
By convention, a communicable disease outbreak is declared over when a period of twice the incubation period of the infectious disease has elapsed without identification of any new case, however, for organisms with a short incubation period (e.g. fewer than ten days), a period of three times the incubation period is preferred.

== Outbreak legislation ==
Outbreak legislation is still in its infancy and not many countries have had a direct and complete set of the provisions. However, some countries do manage the outbreaks using relevant acts, such as public health law. World Health Organization member states are obligated by International Health Regulations to report outbreaks. WHO member states are holding a special session in November 2021 to consider the International Treaty for Pandemic Preparedness and Response to establish further legal obligations in managing disease outbreaks.

== See also ==
- 1947 New York City smallpox outbreak
- 1993 Four Corners hantavirus outbreak
- 2003 Midwest monkeypox outbreak
- 2007 Yap Islands Zika virus outbreak
- 2014 Democratic Republic of the Congo Ebola virus outbreak
- 2019–present coronavirus pandemic by country and territory
- Superspreading event
- Infectious disease on cruise ships
