= Combined-cycle–powered railway locomotive =

Power plant concept

A combined-cycle–powered railway locomotive is a locomotive that uses two primary movers, a gas turbine and a steam turbine, to gain the efficiency of a combined-cycle power plant or a combined gas and steam engine. Steam locomotives were tested in the past but were not ideal for low speeds, and gas-turbine locomotives (GTELs) were used by Union Pacific until the 1970s. Combined-cycle power uses the heat from the gas turbine to make steam from the water to turn a steam turbine, instead of that heat being exhausted and wasted. Engine efficiency for a combined cycle can achieve 60%, compared to diesel motors' efficiency of about 45%.

The gas and steam turbines would turn their separate generators and the steam turbine would have a clutch between it and its generator because steam power is not easily adjustable. Compressed hydrogen would be in a fuel tank, and water for steam would be in another tank, and the Rankine cycle could condense most of the steam back to liquid to return to its tank to repeat the cycle for the steam turbine. Current diesel–electric locomotives with cabs, such as the GE Evolution Series, could be used for control and distributed power, with a cabless combined-cycle–powered locomotive as a B-unit.

== See also ==
- Hydrogen economy
- Hydrogen fuel cell train
- Turbine–electric powertrain
- Schnabel car
