= Combined-cycle power plant =

Assembly of heat engines that work in tandem from the same source of heat

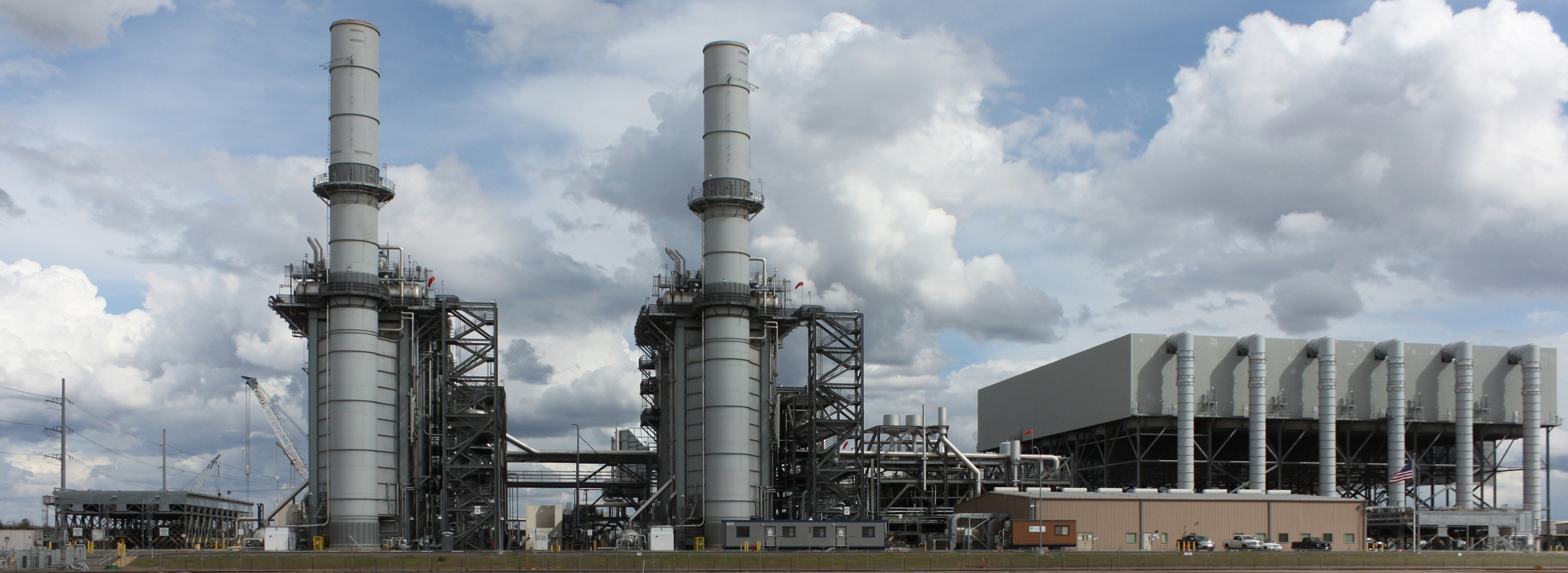
Gateway Generating Station, a 530-megawatt combined-cycle natural-gas–fired power station in Contra Costa County, California

A combined-cycle power plant is an assembly of heat engines that work in tandem from the same source of heat, converting it into mechanical energy. On land, when used to make electricity, the most common type is called a combined-cycle gas turbine (CCGT) plant, which is a kind of gas-fired power plant. The same principle is also used for marine propulsion, where it is called a combined gas and steam (COGAS) plant. Combining two or more thermodynamic cycles improves overall efficiency, which reduces fuel costs.

The principle is that after completing its cycle in the first (usually gas turbine) engine, the working fluid (the exhaust) is still hot enough that a second subsequent heat engine can extract energy from the exhaust. Usually the heat passes through a heat exchanger so that the two engines can use different working fluids.

By generating power from multiple streams of work, the overall efficiency can be increased by about 50–60%. That is, from an overall efficiency of say 43% for a simple cycle with the turbine alone running, to as much as 64% net with the full combined cycle running.

Multiple-stage turbine or steam cycles can also be used, but CCGT plants have advantages for both electricity generation and marine power. The gas turbine cycle can often start very quickly, which gives immediate power. This avoids the need for separate expensive peaker plants, or lets a ship maneuver. Over time the secondary steam cycle will warm up, improving fuel efficiency and providing further power.

In November 2013, the Fraunhofer Institute for Solar Energy Systems ISE assessed the levelised cost of energy for newly built power plants in the German electricity sector. They gave costs of between 78 and €100 /MWh for CCGT plants powered by natural gas. In addition the capital cost of combined-cycle power is relatively low, at around $1000/kW, making it one of the cheapest types of generation to install.

== Historical cycles ==
Historically successful combined cycles have used mercury vapour turbines, magnetohydrodynamic generators and molten carbonate fuel cells, with steam plants for the low-temperature bottoming cycle. Very-low-temperature bottoming cycles have been too costly due to the very large sizes of equipment needed to handle the large mass flows and small temperature differences. However, in cold climates it is common to sell hot power-plant water for hot water and space heating. Vacuum-insulated piping can let this utility reach as far as 90 km.

In stationary and marine power plants, a widely used combined cycle has a large gas turbine (operating by the Brayton cycle). The turbine's hot exhaust powers a steam power plant (operating by the Rankine cycle). This is a combined-cycle gas turbine (CCGT) plant. These achieve a best-of-class real thermal efficiency (noted below) of around 64% in base-load operation. In contrast, a single-cycle steam power plant is limited to efficiencies from 35 to 42%. Many new power plants utilize CCGTs. Stationary CCGTs burn natural gas or synthesis gas from coal. Ships burn fuel oil.

== Basic combined cycle ==
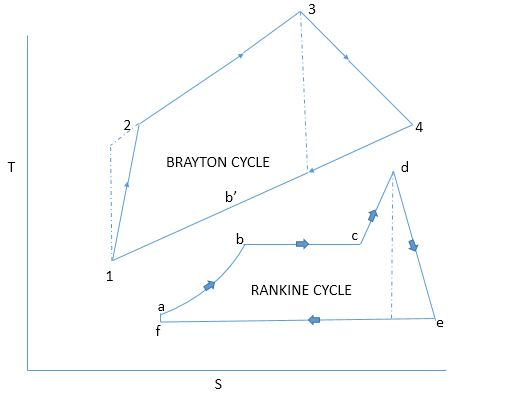
Topping and bottoming cycles

The thermodynamic cycle of the basic combined cycle consists of two power-plant cycles. One is the Joule, or Brayton, cycle, which is a gas-turbine cycle, and the other is the Rankine cycle, which is a steam-turbine cycle. The cycle 1–2–3–4–1, which is the gas turbine power plant cycle, is the topping cycle. It depicts the heat- and work-transfer process taking place in the high-temperature region.

The cycle a–b–c–d–e–f–a, which is the Rankine steam cycle, takes place at a lower temperature and is known as the bottoming cycle. Transfer of heat energy from high-temperature exhaust gas to water and steam takes place in a waste-heat recovery boiler in the bottoming cycle. During the constant-pressure process 4–1, the exhaust gases from the gas turbine reject heat. The feed water and wet and superheated steam absorb some of this heat in the process a–b, b–c and c–d.

=== Steam generators ===
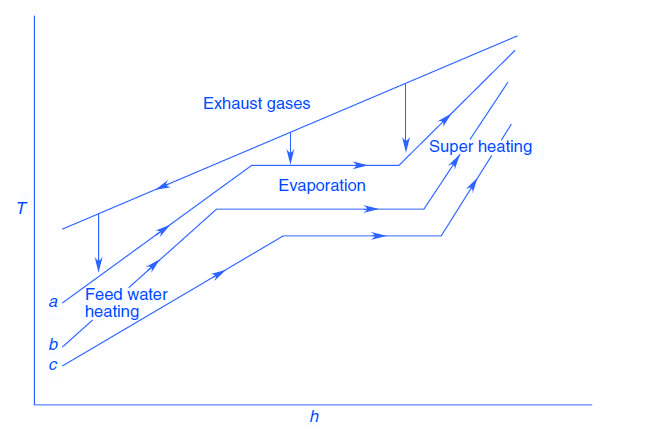
Heat transfer from hot gases to water and steam

The steam power plant takes its input heat from the high-temperature exhaust gases from a gas-turbine power plant. The steam thus generated can be used to drive a steam turbine. The waste-heat recovery boiler (WHRB) has three sections: economiser, evaporator and superheater.

=== Cheng cycle ===
The Cheng cycle is a simplified form of combined cycle where the steam turbine is eliminated by injecting steam directly into the combustion turbine. This has been used since the mid 1970s and allows recovery of waste heat with less total complexity, but at the loss of the additional power and redundancy of a true combined-cycle system. It has no additional steam turbine or generator, and therefore it cannot be used for backup or supplementary power. It is named after American professor D. Y. Cheng, who patented the design in 1976.

== Design principles ==
Explanation of the layout and principle of a combined-cycle power generator

Working principle of a combined-cycle power plant (Legend: 1-Electric generators, 2-Steam turbine, 3-Condenser, 4-Pump, 5-Boiler/heat exchanger, 6-Gas turbine)

The efficiency of a heat engine, the fraction of input heat energy that can be converted to useful work, is limited by the temperature difference between the heat entering the engine and the exhaust heat leaving the engine.

In a thermal power station, water is the working medium. High-pressure steam requires strong, bulky components. High temperatures require expensive alloys made from nickel or cobalt, rather than inexpensive steel. These alloys limit practical steam temperatures to 655°C while the lower temperature of a steam plant is fixed by the temperature of the cooling water. With these limits, a steam plant has a fixed upper efficiency of 35–42%.

An open-circuit gas-turbine cycle has a compressor, a combustor and a turbine. For gas turbines the amount of metal that must withstand the high temperatures and pressures is small, so lower quantities of expensive materials can be used. In this type of cycle, the input temperature to the turbine (the firing temperature), is relatively high (900 to 1,400°C). The output temperature of the flue gas is also high (450 to 650°C). This is therefore high enough to provide heat for a second cycle which uses steam as the working fluid (a Rankine cycle).

In a combined-cycle power plant, the heat of the gas turbine's exhaust is used to generate steam by passing it through a heat-recovery steam generator (HRSG) with a live steam temperature between 420 and 580°C. The condenser of the Rankine cycle is usually cooled by water from a lake, river, sea or cooling towers. This temperature can be as low as 15°C.

=== Typical size ===
Plant size is an important factor in overall cost. The larger plant sizes benefit from economies of scale (lower initial cost per output power) and improved efficiency.

For large-scale power generation, a typical set would be a 270 MW primary gas turbine coupled to a 130 MW secondary steam turbine, providing a total output of 400 MW. A typical power station might consist of between one and six such sets.

Gas turbines for large-scale power generation are manufactured by at least four separate groups – General Electric, Siemens, Mitsubishi-Hitachi, and Ansaldo Energia. These groups are also developing, testing or marketing gas turbines in excess of 300 MW (for 60 Hz applications) and 400 MW (for 50 Hz applications). Combined-cycle units are made up of one or more such gas turbines, each with a waste-heat steam generator arranged to supply steam to a single or multiple steam turbines, thus forming a combined-cycle block, or unit. Combined-cycle block sizes offered by three major manufacturers (Alstom, General Electric and Siemens) can range anywhere from 50 MW to well over 1300 MW, with costs approaching $670/kW.

=== Unfired boiler ===
The heat-recovery boiler is item 5 in the COGAS figure shown above. Hot gas-turbine exhaust enters the superheater, then passes through the evaporator and, finally, through the economiser section as it flows out from the boiler. Feed water comes in through the economizer and then exits after having attained saturation temperature in the water or steam circuit. Finally it flows through the evaporator and superheater. If the temperature of the gases entering the heat-recovery boiler is higher, then the temperature of the exiting gases is also high.

=== Dual-pressure boiler ===
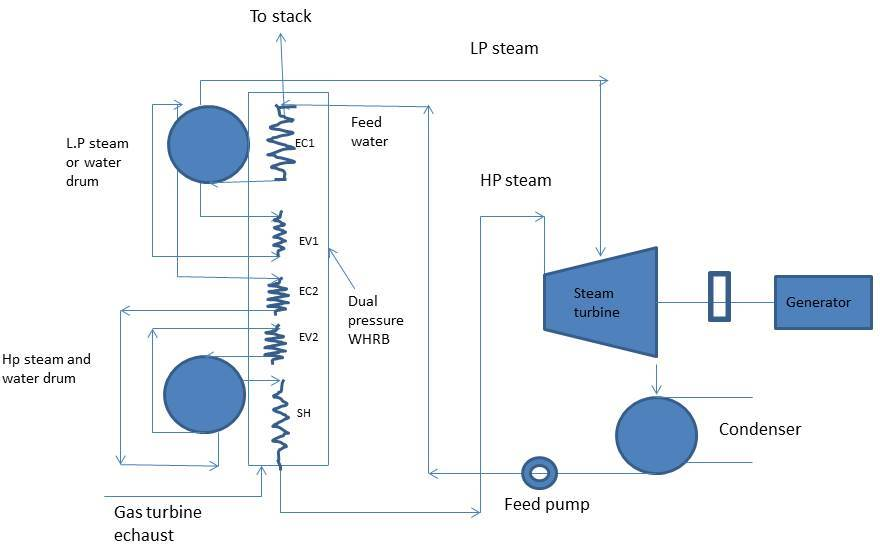
Steam-turbine plant layout with dual-pressure heat-recovery boiler

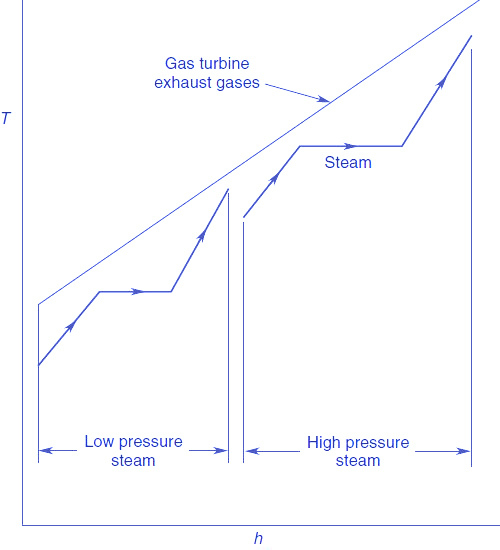
Heat exchange in dual-pressure heat-recovery boiler

In order to remove the maximum amount of heat from the gasses exiting the high-temperature cycle, boilers with two water/steam drums are often employed. The low-pressure drum is connected to the low-pressure economizer or evaporator. The low-pressure steam is generated in the low-temperature zone of the turbine exhaust gasses. The low-pressure steam is supplied to the low-temperature turbine. A superheater can be provided in the low-pressure circuit.

Some part of the feed water from the low-pressure zone is transferred to the high-pressure economizer by a booster pump. This economizer heats the water to its saturation temperature. This saturated water goes through the high-temperature zone of the boiler and is supplied to the high-pressure turbine.

=== Supplementary firing ===
The HRSG can be designed to burn supplementary fuel after the gas turbine. Supplementary burners are also called duct burners. Duct burning is possible because the turbine exhaust gas (flue gas) still contains some oxygen. Temperature limits at the gas turbine inlet force the turbine to use excess air, above the optimal stoichiometric ratio to burn the fuel. Often in gas turbine designs part of the compressed air flow bypasses the burner in order to cool the turbine blades. The turbine exhaust is already hot, so a regenerative air preheater is not required as in a conventional steam plant. However, a fresh air fan blowing directly into the duct permits a duct-burning steam plant to operate even when the gas turbine cannot.

Without supplementary firing, the thermal efficiency of a combined-cycle power plant is higher. But more flexible plant operations make a marine CCGT safer by permitting a ship to operate with equipment failures. A flexible stationary plant can make more money. Duct burning raises the flue temperature, which increases the quantity or temperature of the steam (e.g. to 84 bar, 525 degree Celsius). This improves the efficiency of the steam cycle. Supplementary firing lets the plant respond to fluctuations of electrical load, because duct burners can have very good efficiency with partial loads. It can enable higher steam production to compensate for the failure of another unit. Also, coal can be burned in the steam generator as an economical supplementary fuel.

Supplementary firing can raise exhaust temperatures from 600°C (GT exhaust) to 800 or even 1000°C. Supplemental firing does not raise the efficiency of most combined cycles. For single boilers it can raise the efficiency if fired to 700–750°C; for multiple boilers however, the flexibility of the plant should be the major attraction.

"Maximum supplementary firing" is the condition when the maximum fuel is fired with the oxygen available in the gas turbine exhaust.

== Fuel for combined-cycle power plants ==
Combined-cycle plants are usually powered by natural gas, although fuel oil, synthesis gas or other fuels can be used. The supplementary fuel may be natural gas, fuel oil, or coal. Biofuels can also be used. Integrated solar combined-cycle power stations combine the energy harvested from solar radiation with another fuel to cut fuel costs and environmental impact (See: ISCC section). Many next generation nuclear power plants can use the higher temperature range of a Brayton top cycle, as well as the increase in thermal efficiency offered by a Rankine bottoming cycle.

Where the extension of a gas pipeline is impractical or cannot be economically justified, electricity needs in remote areas can be met with small-scale combined-cycle plants using renewable fuels. Instead of natural gas, these gasify and burn agricultural and forestry waste, which is often readily available in rural areas.

=== Managing low-grade fuels in turbines ===
Gas turbines burn mainly natural gas and light oils such as diesel fuel and kerosene (e.g. jet fuel). Crude oil, residual fuel (heavy fuel oil), and lower-grade distillates contain corrosive components such as sulfur and require fuel treatment equipment. In addition, unrefined crude oils, especially heavy sour oils, contain metals and metal compounds such as vanadium which form ash deposits when burned. The combination of high temperatures, corrosion, and ash can derate gas turbines' power output by as much as 15%. They may still be economically attractive fuels, however, particularly in combined-cycle plants.

Sodium and potassium are removed from residual fuel, crude oil, and heavy distillates by a water washing procedure. A simpler and less expensive purification system will do the same job for light crude and light distillates. A magnesium additive system may also be needed to reduce the corrosive effects if vanadium is present. Fuels requiring such treatment must have a separate fuel-treatment plant and a system of accurate fuel monitoring to assure reliable, low-maintenance operation of gas turbines.

=== Hydrogen ===
Xcel Energy is going to build two natural gas power plants in the Midwestern United States that can mix 30% hydrogen with the natural gas. Intermountain Power Plant is being retrofitted to a natural gas/hydrogen power plant that can run on 30% hydrogen as well, and is scheduled to run on pure hydrogen by 2045. However others think low-carbon hydrogen should be used for things which are harder to decarbonize, such as making fertilizer, so there may not be enough for electricity generation.

== Configuration ==
Combined-cycle systems can have single-shaft or multi-shaft configurations. Also, there are several configurations of steam systems.

The most fuel-efficient power generation cycles use an unfired heat recovery steam generator (HRSG) with modular pre-engineered components. These unfired steam cycles are also the lowest in initial cost, and they are often part of a single shaft system that is installed as a unit.

Supplementary-fired and multishaft combined-cycle systems are usually selected for specific fuels, applications or situations. For example, cogeneration combined-cycle systems sometimes need more heat, or higher temperatures, and electricity is a lower priority. Multishaft systems with supplementary firing can provide a wider range of temperatures or heat to electric power. Systems burning low quality fuels such as brown coal or peat might use relatively expensive closed-cycle helium turbines as the topping cycle to avoid even more expensive fuel processing and gasification that would be needed by a conventional gas turbine.

A typical single-shaft system has one gas turbine, one steam turbine, one generator and one heat recovery steam generator (HRSG). The gas turbine and steam turbine are both coupled in tandem to a single electrical generator on a single shaft. This arrangement is simpler to operate, smaller, with a lower startup cost.

Single-shaft arrangements can have less flexibility and reliability than multi-shaft systems. With some expense, there are ways to add operational flexibility: Most often, the operator desires to operate the gas turbine as a peaking plant. In these plants, the steam turbine's shaft can be disconnected with a synchro-self-shifting (SSS) clutch, for start up or for simple cycle operation of the gas turbine. Another less common set of options enable more heat or standalone operation of the steam turbine to increase reliability: Duct burning, perhaps with a fresh air blower in the duct and a clutch on the gas turbine side of the shaft.

A multi-shaft system usually has only one steam system for up to three gas turbines. Having only one large steam turbine and heat sink has economies of scale and can have lower cost operations and maintenance. A larger steam turbine can also use higher pressures, for a more efficient steam cycle. However, a multi-shaft system is about 5% higher in initial cost.

The overall plant size and the associated number of gas turbines required can also determine which type of plant is more economical. A collection of single-shaft combined-cycle power plants can be more costly to operate and maintain, because there are more pieces of equipment. However, it can save interest costs by letting a business add plant capacity as it is needed.

Multiple-pressure reheat steam cycles are applied to combined-cycle systems with gas turbines with exhaust gas temperatures near 600 °C. Single- and multiple-pressure non-reheat steam cycles are applied to combined-cycle systems with gas turbines that have exhaust gas temperatures of 540 °C or less. Selection of the steam cycle for a specific application is determined by an economic evaluation that considers a plant's installed cost, fuel cost and quality, duty cycle, and the costs of interest, business risks, and operations and maintenance.

== Efficiency ==
By combining both gas and steam cycles, high input temperatures and low output temperatures can be achieved. The efficiency of the cycles add, because they are powered by the same fuel source. So, a combined-cycle plant has a thermodynamic cycle that operates between the gas-turbine's high firing temperature and the waste heat temperature from the condensers of the steam cycle. This large range means that the Carnot efficiency of the cycle is high. The actual efficiency, while lower than the Carnot efficiency, is still higher than that of either plant on its own.

The electric efficiency of a combined-cycle power station, if calculated as electric energy produced as a percentage of the lower heating value of the fuel consumed, can be over 60% when operating new, i.e. unaged, and at continuous output which are ideal conditions.

As with single cycle thermal units, combined-cycle units may also deliver low temperature heat energy for industrial processes, district heating and other uses. This is called cogeneration and such power plants are often referred to as a combined heat and power (CHP) plant.

In general, combined-cycle efficiencies in service are over 50% on a lower heating value and Gross Output basis. Most combined-cycle units, especially the larger units, have peak, steady-state efficiencies on the LHV basis of 55 to 59%.

A limitation of combined cycles is that efficiency is reduced when not running at continuous output. During start up, the second cycle can take time to start up. Thus efficiency is initially much lower until the second cycle is running, which can take an hour or more.

=== Fuel heating value ===
Heat engine efficiency can be based on the fuel Higher Heating Value (HHV), including latent heat of vaporisation that would be recuperated in condensing boilers, or the Lower Heating Value (LHV), excluding it. The HHV of methane is 55.50 MJ/kg (23,860 BTU/lb), compared to a 50.00 MJ/kg (21,500 BTU/lb) LHV: a 11% increase.

=== Boosting efficiency ===
Efficiency of the turbine is increased when combustion can run hotter, so the working fluid expands more. Therefore, efficiency is limited by whether the first stage of turbine blades can survive higher temperatures. Cooling and materials research are continuing. A common technique, adopted from aircraft, is to pressurise hot-stage turbine blades with coolant. This is also bled-off in proprietary ways to improve the aerodynamic efficiencies of the turbine blades. Different vendors have experimented with different coolants. Air is common but steam is increasingly used. Some vendors might now utilize single-crystal turbine blades in the hot section, a technique already common in military aircraft engines.

The efficiency of CCGT and GT can also be boosted by pre-cooling combustion air. This increases its density, also increasing the expansion ratio of the turbine. This is practised in hot climates and also has the effect of increasing power output. This is achieved by evaporative cooling of water using a moist matrix placed in the turbine's inlet, or by using Ice storage air conditioning. The latter has the advantage of greater improvements due to the lower temperatures available. Furthermore, ice storage can be used as a means of load control or load shifting since ice can be made during periods of low power demand and, potentially in the future the anticipated high availability of other resources such as renewables during certain periods.

Combustion technology is a proprietary but very active area of research, because fuels, gasification and carburation all affect fuel efficiency. A typical focus is to combine aerodynamic and chemical computer simulations to find combustor designs that assure complete fuel burn up, yet minimize both pollution and dilution of the hot exhaust gases. Some combustors inject other materials, such air or steam, to reduce pollution by reducing the formation of nitrates and ozone.

Another active area of research is the steam generator for the Rankine cycle. Typical plants already use a two-stage steam turbine, reheating the steam between the two stages. When the heat-exchangers' thermal conductivity can be improved, efficiency improves. As in nuclear reactors, tubes might be made thinner (e.g. from stronger or more corrosion-resistant steel). Another approach might use silicon carbide sandwiches, which do not corrode.

There is also some development of modified Rankine cycles. Two promising areas are ammonia/water mixtures, and turbines that utilize supercritical carbon dioxide.

Modern CCGT plants also need software that is precisely tuned to every choice of fuel, equipment, temperature, humidity and pressure. When a plant is improved, the software becomes a moving target. CCGT software is also expensive to test, because actual time is limited on the multimillion-dollar prototypes of new CCGT plants. Testing usually simulates unusual fuels and conditions, but validates the simulations with selected data points measured on actual equipment.

=== Competition ===
There is active competition to reach higher efficiencies. Research aimed at 1,370 °C (2,500 °F) turbine inlet temperature has led to even more efficient combined cycles.

Nearly 60% LHV efficiency (54% HHV efficiency) was reached in the Baglan Bay power station, using a GE H-technology gas turbine with a NEM 3 pressure reheat boiler, using steam from the heat recovery steam generator (HRSG) to cool the turbine blades.

In May 2011 Siemens announced they had achieved a 60.75% efficiency with a 578 megawatt SGT5-8000H gas turbine at the Irsching Power Station.

The Chubu Electric’s Nishi-ku, Nagoya power plant 405 MW 7HA is expected to have 62% gross combined-cycle efficiency.

On 28 April 2016, the plant run by Électricité de France in Bouchain was certified by Guinness World Records as the world's most efficient combined-cycle power plant at 62.22%. It uses a General Electric 9HA, that claimed 41.5% simple cycle efficiency and 61.4% in combined-cycle mode, with a gas turbine output of 397 MW to 470 MW and a combined output of 592 MW to 701 MW. Its firing temperature is between 2,600 and 2,900 °F (1,430 and 1,590 °C), its overall pressure ratio is 21.8 to 1.

In December 2016, Mitsubishi claimed a LHV efficiency of greater than 63% for some members of its J Series turbines.

In December 2017, GE claimed 64% in its latest 826 MW HA plant, up from 63.7%. They said this was due to advances in additive manufacturing and combustion. Their press release said that they planned to achieve 65% by the early 2020s.

== Integrated gasification combined cycle (IGCC) ==
An integrated gasification combined cycle, or IGCC, is a power plant using synthesis gas (syngas). Syngas can be produced from a number of sources, including coal and biomass. The system uses gas and steam turbines, the steam turbine operating from the heat left over from the gas turbine. This process can raise electricity generation efficiency to around 50%.

== Integrated solar combined cycle (ISCC) ==
An integrated solar combined cycle (ISCC) is a hybrid technology in which a solar thermal field is integrated within a combined-cycle plant. In ISCC plants, solar energy is used as an auxiliary heat supply, supporting the steam cycle, which results in increased generation capacity or a reduction of fossil fuel use.

Thermodynamic benefits are that daily steam turbine startup losses are eliminated.

Major factors limiting the load output of a combined-cycle power plant are the allowed pressure and temperature transients of the steam turbine and the heat recovery steam generator waiting times to establish required steam chemistry conditions and warm-up times for the balance of plant and the main piping system. Those limitations also influence the fast start-up capability of the gas turbine by requiring waiting times. And waiting gas turbines consume gas. The solar component, if the plant is started after sunshine, or before, if there is heat storage, allows the preheat of the steam to the required conditions. That is, the plant is started faster and with less consumption of gas before achieving operating conditions. Economic benefits are that the solar components costs are 25% to 75% those of a Solar Energy Generating Systems plant of the same collector surface.

The first such system to come online was the Archimede combined cycle power plant, Italy in 2010, followed by Martin Next Generation Solar Energy Center in Florida, and in 2011 by the Kuraymat ISCC Power Plant in Egypt, Yazd power plant in Iran, Hassi R'mel in Algeria, Ain Beni Mathar in Morocco. In Australia CS Energy's Kogan Creek and Macquarie Generation's Liddell Power Station started construction of a solar Fresnel boost section (44 MW and 9 MW), but the projects never became active.

== Bottoming cycles ==
In most successful combined cycles, the bottoming cycle for power is a conventional steam Rankine cycle.

It is already common in cold climates (such as Finland) to drive community heating systems from a steam power plant's condenser heat. Such cogeneration systems can yield theoretical efficiencies above 95%.

Bottoming cycles producing electricity from the steam condenser's heat exhaust are theoretically possible, but conventional turbines are uneconomically large. The small temperature differences between condensing steam and outside air or water require very large movements of mass to drive the turbines.

Although not reduced to practice, a vortex of air can concentrate the mass flows for a bottoming cycle. Theoretical studies of the Vortex engine show that if built at scale it is an economical bottoming cycle for a large steam Rankine cycle power plant.

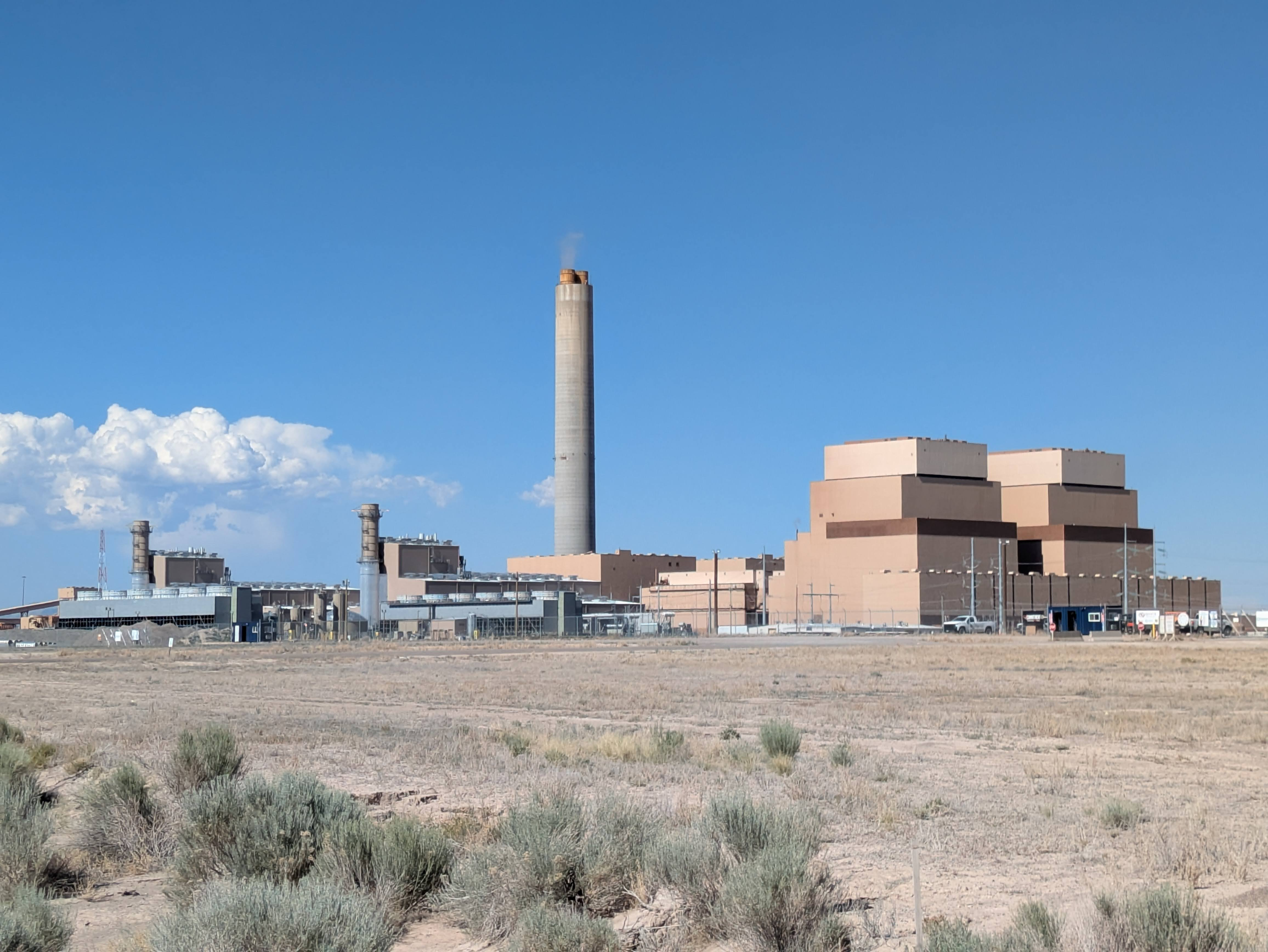
Intermountain Power Plant showing completed combined-cycle units on the left and retiring coal units on the right. The plant will be converted to 100% hydrogen by 2045.

== Combined-cycle hydrogen power plant ==
A combined-cycle hydrogen power plant is a power plant that uses hydrogen in a combined-cycle power plant. A green hydrogen combined-cycle power plant is only about 40% efficient, after electrolysis and reburning for electricity, and is a viable option for energy storage for longer term compared to battery storage. Natural gas power plants could be converted to hydrogen power plants with minimal renovation or do a combined mix of natural gas and hydrogen.

=== Retrofitting natural gas power plants ===
Natural gas power plants could be designed with a transition to hydrogen in mind by having wider inlet pipes to the burner to increase flow rates because hydrogen is less dense than natural gas, and have the right material to prevent hydrogen embrittlement.

=== Limitations ===
Current electrolysis plants are not capable of providing the scale of hydrogen that is needed to provide for a large scale power plant. On site electrolysis may be needed, then storing large amounts of hydrogen could take up a lot of space if it is only compressed hydrogen and not Liquid hydrogen. Hydrogen embrittlement could happen in pipelines, but 316L stainless steel pipelines could handle compressed hydrogen above 50 Bar (unit), which is what compressed natural gas is piped at, or wider pipelines could be built for hydrogen. Polyethylene or fiber-reinforced polymer pipelines could also be used.

==== Nitrous oxide ====
Whilst hydrogen produces no carbon dioxide when burned, its higher flame temperature causes more nitrous oxide to be produced. A selective catalytic reduction process could be implemented to break NO_{2} down into just nitrogen and water. The water vapor produced from burning hydrogen could be used as a diluent to lower the high burning temp that creates the nitrous oxide.

==== Corrosion ====
Corrosion of the turbine from the water vapor from the hydrogen flame could reduce plant life or parts may need to be replaced more often.

==== Fuel handling ====
Hydrogen is the smallest and lightest element and can leak more easily at connection points and joints. Hydrogen diffuses quickly mitigating explosions. A hydrogen flame is also not as visible as a standard flame.

=== Transition to a renewable power grid ===
Renewable and conventional energy production in Germany over two weeks in 2022. In hours with low wind and PV production, hard coal and gas fill the gap. Nuclear and biomass show almost no flexibility. PV follows the increased consumption during daytime hours but varies seasonally.

Wind and solar power are variable renewable energy sources that aren't as consistent as base load energy. Hydrogen could help renewables by capturing excess energy, with electrolysis, when they produce too much, and fill the gaps with that energy when they aren't producing as much.

== See also ==
- Allam power cycle
- Cheng cycle
- Combined gas and steam
- Combined cycle powered railway locomotive
- Cost of electricity by source
- Hydrogen-cooled turbo generator
- Compound steam engine
