= Cheng cycle =

Thermodynamic cycle

The Cheng cycle is a thermodynamic cycle which uses a combination of two working fluids, one gas and one steam. It can therefore be considered a combination of the Brayton cycle and the Rankine cycle. It was named for Dr. Dah Yu Cheng.

The company founded by Dr. Cheng has developed systems in partnership with both GM and GE turbine manufacturers to take advantage of the Cheng cycle by modification of existing turbine designs before construction. The Cheng cycle involves the heated exhaust gas from the turbine being used to make steam in a heat recovery steam generator. The steam so produced is injected into the gas turbine's combustion chamber to increase power output. The process can be thought of as a parallel combination of the gas-turbine Brayton cycle and a steam-turbine Rankine cycle. The cycle was invented by Prof. Dah Yu Cheng of the University of Santa Clara, who patented it in 1976.

A fully Cheng-cycle gas/steam two-fluid turbine can achieve a theoretical thermal efficiency of 60%, matching or even exceeding many traditional combined-cycle gas turbines that keep the steam Rankine cycle and gas Brayton cycle as separate loops.

== See also ==
- Combined cycle
- Brayton cycle
- Rankine cycle
- Cogeneration
