= Celebrity Infinity =

Millennium-class cruise ship operated by Celebrity Cruises

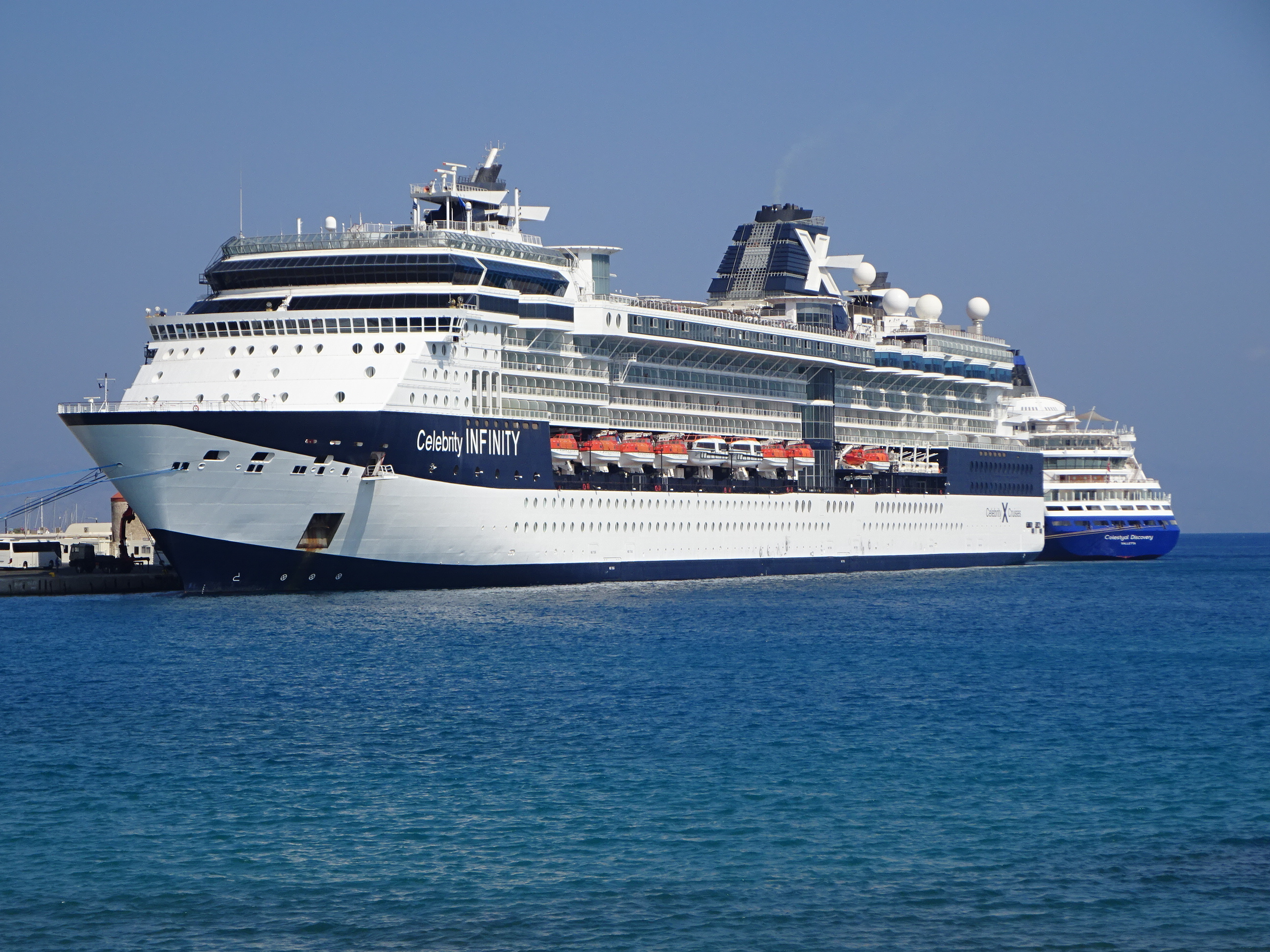
- Celebrity Infinity in Rhodes, 2024

History

Malta
- Name: 2001–2007: Infinity; 2007–present: Celebrity Infinity
- Owner: Royal Caribbean Group
- Operator: Celebrity Cruises
- Port of registry: 2001–2002: Monrovia, Liberia; 2002–2008: Nassau, Bahamas; 2008–present: Valletta, Malta
- Ordered: February 1998
- Builder: Chantiers de l'Atlantique; St. Nazaire, France
- Yard number: S31
- Launched: 9 June 2000
- Sponsored by: Solveig Wilhelmsen
- Christened: 29 April 2001
- Acquired: 25 February 2001
- Maiden voyage: 3 March 2001
- In service: 2001–present
- Identification: Call sign: 9HJD9; IMO number: 9189421; MMSI number: 249048000

General characteristics
- Class & type: Millennium-class cruise ship
- Tonnage: 90,940 GT; 11,788 DWT
- Length: 964.6 ft (294.0 m)
- Beam: 105.6 ft (32.2 m)
- Draught: 26 ft (8 m)
- Decks: 12
- Installed power: Two General Electric gas turbines; 50,000 kW (combined)
- Propulsion: 2 × 19 MW Rolls-Royce/Alstom Mermaid azimuth thrusters
- Speed: 24 knots (44 km/h; 28 mph)
- Capacity: 2,170
- Crew: 999

GTS Celebrity Infinity (formerly Infinity) is a Millennium-class cruise ship operated by Celebrity Cruises, a subsidiary of Royal Caribbean Group. She measures 90,940 GT and 294 m (965 ft) long, and holds a capacity of 2,170 passengers across 12 decks. After Royal Caribbean signed a letter of intent with French shipbuilder Chantiers de l'Atlantique in February 1998, she was floated out in June 2000 and delivered in February 2001, making her the second Millennium-class ship to join the fleet following Celebrity Millennium.

== Construction ==
In February 1998, Royal Caribbean signed a letter of intent with French shipbuilder Chantiers de l'Atlantique to build two new ships, with an option for two more, that would make up a new class of ships, dubbed the Millennium class. Designed to be an evolution from Celebrity's Century-class ships, the two ships were initially planned to measure 85,000 GT, have a guest capacity of approximately 1,900, and be delivered in June 2000 and January 2001, respectively.

In March 2000, Celebrity announced the second Millennium-class ship would be named Infinity. On 9 June 2000, she was launched from the shipyard in Saint-Nazaire, France. On 25 February 2001, Celebrity took delivery of Infinity in Fort Lauderdale, Florida after she embarked on a transatlantic crossing from Saint-Nazaire. Formal naming festivities were held on 29 April 2001 in Los Angeles, where Infinity was christened by Solveig Wilhelmsen.

== Service history ==
The ship's maiden voyage was originally scheduled for 3 February 2001, a 14-day cruise from Port Everglades in Fort Lauderdale through the Panama Canal before arriving in San Diego for her inaugural season. However, the voyage was later postponed by one month to 3 March 2001. Her inaugural season also included cruises to Hawaii before she headed to Alaska in summer 2001, joining fleet-mate Mercury.

Since 2002, she has also cruised to South America, Antarctica, the Caribbean from San Juan, Puerto Rico and Fort Lauderdale, and Europe from Harwich and throughout the Mediterranean.

On 3 June 2016, while docking in Ketchikan, Alaska, the ship crashed into the dock on her port side, causing a 10-to-15-foot (3.0 to 4.6 m) scrape along her bow above the waterline and heavily damaged the dock. Winds were reportedly gusting to 45 miles per hour (72 km/h) from the ship's starboard side at the time of the accident, which accelerated the ship's approach. There were no reported injuries or pollution caused by the incident. In addition to the damage to the ship, the collision caused $2–3 million in damage to the dock. The ship was quickly repaired and resumed sailing following the collision.

In summer 2020, Celebrity Infinity was scheduled to sail in the Mediterranean, but the COVID-19 pandemic forced the cancellation of the season. Following the cruise line's pause in operations, she is scheduled to resume sailing from Port Everglades on 25 June 2022, sailing weekly Caribbean voyages. Beginning in summer 2023, the ship will be stationed year-round in the Mediterranean, making it the first time Celebrity will have a year-round operation in the region.

=== COVID-19 pandemic ===
On 23 March 2020, two crew members reportedly tested positive for the coronavirus, raising concerns among crew members of their safety while on board. On 14 April 2020, nearly two weeks after a crew member died aboard the ship, a class action lawsuit was filed on behalf of over a thousand Celebrity employees over the company's allegedly inadequate response measures to outbreaks aboard its ships.

=== Post-COVID ===
On February 15, 2026, the ship completely lost power during a cruise near Piraeus, Greece. Four tugboats towed the helpless ship into port and its subsequent cruise was canceled.

== Design and specifications ==
Along with her sister ships, Infinity is equipped with a turbo-electric COGAS power plant. The COGAS plant consists of gas and steam turbines, with the latter being driven by steam generated using the heat from the exhaust of the gas turbines. In this way, some of the otherwise lost energy is reclaimed and the specific fuel consumption of the plant is decreased. Propulsion is provided by two "Mermaid" azimuth pod-propulsion units from Kamewa and Cegelec (now Alstom). The ship also has three bow thrusters.

=== Recurring pod-propulsion issues ===
Infinity and her sister ships have experienced problems with the pod-propulsion system. Months following her delivery, Celebrity reported Infinity began experiencing problems with a faulty ball bearing in the ship's starboard propulsion unit; it necessitated an emergency dry dock repair in June 2001 in Victoria, British Columbia, which resulted in cancelled sailings. In April 2002, more dry dock repairs were made to the ship's propulsion pods, as they were reportedly showing premature wear, preventing her from cruising at maximum speed. In a third dry dock in February 2003, Celebrity had all ball-bearing units on Infinity replaced, forcing the cancellation of two sailings. A fourth dry dock took place in April 2004 to replace a thrust-bearing propulsion unit. A fifth dry dock was held in March 2005 to replace the ship's starboard thrust bearing unit. A sixth dry dock was performed in September 2006 to repair one of the ship's propulsion pods.

Numerous unsuccessful repairs led Royal Caribbean to file a lawsuit against Rolls-Royce and Alstom in August 2003 for $300 million to recover lost revenue and the costs associated with the faulty pods on all four Millennium-class ships. Royal Caribbean settled the lawsuit in January 2010.
