= Transmission coefficient (epidemiology) =

The transmission coefficient is needed for models of Transmission where for instance a vector carries a pathogen or parasite between hosts. It is represented by β and it is the rate at which a pathogen moves from infected individuals to susceptible individuals in the population. It must be between 0 and 1. The transmission coefficient is used in the equation: :$\frac{dY}{dt} = \frac{\beta XY}{N} - \gamma Y$

== See also ==
- Basic reproduction number
