= Pathogen transmission =

Passing of a pathogen from one organism to another

In medicine, public health, and biology, transmission is the passing of a pathogen causing communicable disease from an infected host individual or group to a particular individual or group, regardless of whether the other individual was previously infected. The term strictly refers to the transmission of microorganisms directly from one individual to another by one or more of the following means:

- airborne transmission – very small dry and wet particles that stay in the air for long periods of time allowing airborne contamination even after the departure of the host. Particle size < 5 μm.
- droplet transmission – small and usually wet particles that stay in the air for a short period of time. Contamination usually occurs in the presence of the host. Particle size > 5 μm.
- direct physical contact – touching an infected individual, including sexual contact
- indirect physical contact – usually by touching a contaminated surface, including soil (fomite)
- fecal–oral transmission – usually from unwashed hands, contaminated food or water sources due to lack of sanitation and hygiene, an important transmission route in pediatrics, veterinary medicine and developing countries.
- via contaminated hypodermic needles or blood products

Transmission can also be indirect, via another organism, either a vector (e.g. a mosquito or fly) or an intermediate host (e.g. tapeworm in pigs can be transmitted to humans who ingest improperly cooked pork). Indirect transmission could involve zoonoses or, more typically, larger pathogens like macroparasites with more complex life cycles. Transmissions can be autochthonous (i.e. between two individuals in the same place) or may involve travel of the microorganism or the affected hosts.

A 2024 World Health Organization report standardized the terminology for the transmission modes of all respiratory pathogens in alignment with particle physics: airborne transmission; inhalation; direct deposition; and contact. But these newly standardized terms have yet to be translated to policy, including infection control policy or the pandemic accords or updated International Health Regulations.

== Definition and related terms ==
An infectious disease agent can be transmitted in two ways: as horizontal disease agent transmission from one individual to another in the same generation (peers in the same age group) by either direct contact (licking, touching, biting), or indirect contact through air – cough or sneeze (vectors or fomites that allow the transmission of the agent causing the disease without physical contact) or by vertical disease transmission, passing the agent causing the disease from parent to offspring, such as in prenatal or perinatal transmission.

The term infectivity describes the ability of an organism to enter, survive and multiply in the host, while the infectiousness of a disease agent indicates the comparative ease with which the disease agent is transmitted to other hosts. Transmission of pathogens can occur by direct contact, through contaminated food, body fluids or objects, by airborne inhalation or through vector organisms.

Transmissibility is the probability of an infection, given a contact between an infected host and a noninfected host.

Community transmission means that the source of infection for the spread of an illness is unknown or a link in terms of contacts between patients and other people is missing. It refers to the difficulty in grasping the epidemiological link in the community beyond confirmed cases.

Local transmission means that the source of the infection has been identified within the reporting location (such as within a country, region or city).

== Routes of transmission ==
The route of transmission is important to epidemiologists because patterns of contact vary between different populations and different groups of populations depending on socio-economic, cultural and other features. For example, low personal and food hygiene due to the lack of a clean water supply may result in increased transmission of diseases by the fecal-oral route, such as cholera. Differences in incidence of such diseases between different groups can also throw light on the routes of transmission of the disease. For example, if it is noted that polio is more common in cities in underdeveloped countries, without a clean water supply, than in cities with a good plumbing system, we might advance the theory that polio is spread by the fecal-oral route. Two routes are considered to be airborne: Airborne infections and droplet infections.

=== Airborne infection ===
"Airborne transmission refers to infectious agents that are spread via droplet nuclei (residue from evaporated droplets) containing infective microorganisms. These organisms can survive outside the body and remain suspended in the air for long periods of time. They infect others via the upper and lower respiratory tracts." The size of the particles for airborne infections need to be < 5 μm. It includes both dry and wet aerosols and thus requires usually higher levels of isolation since it can stay suspended in the air for longer periods of time. i.e., separate ventilation systems or negative pressure environments are needed to avoid general contamination. e.g., tuberculosis, chickenpox, measles.

=== Droplet infection ===
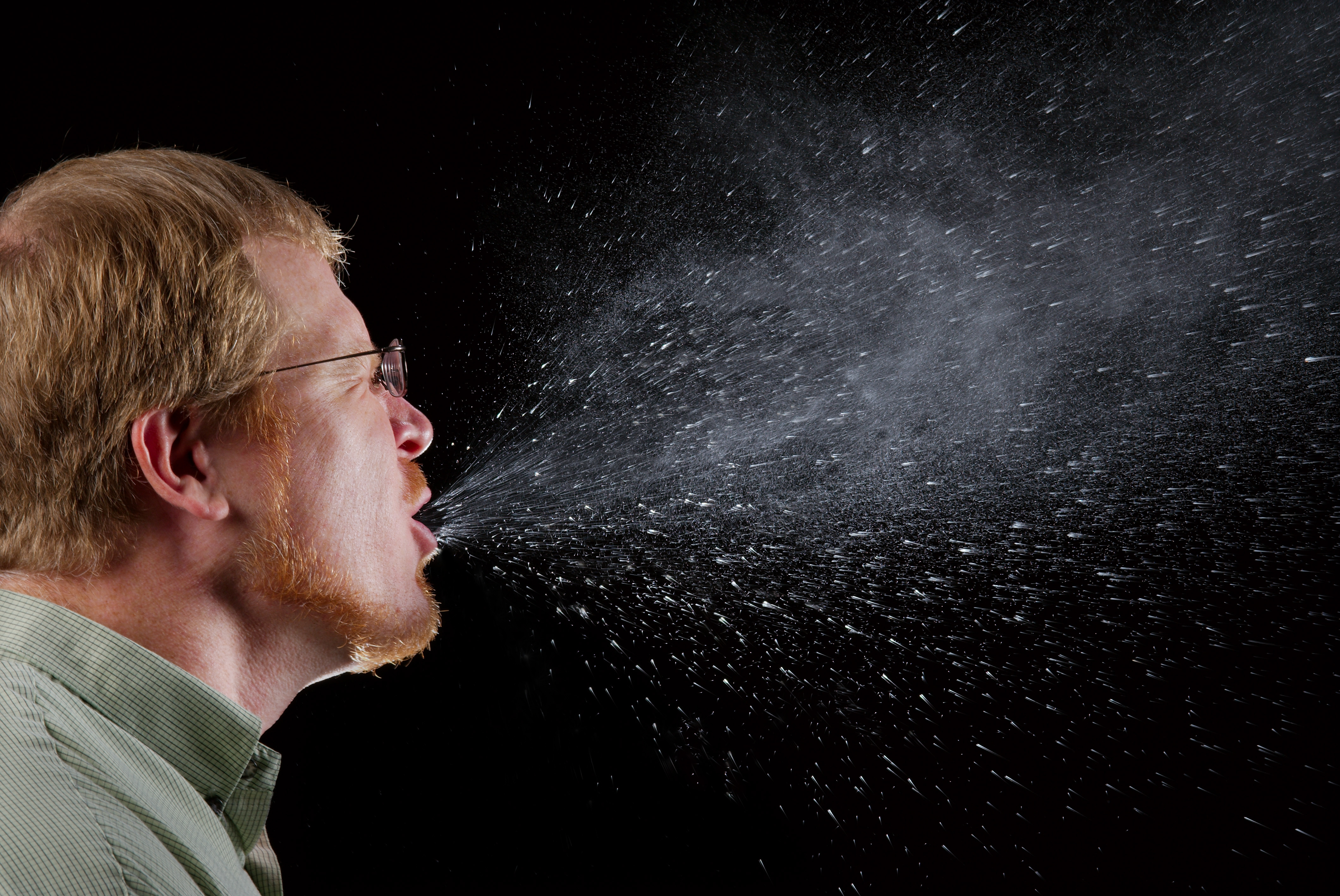
Respiratory droplets are released through talking, coughing, or sneezing.

A common form of transmission is by way of respiratory droplets, generated by coughing, sneezing, or talking. Respiratory droplet transmission is the usual route for respiratory infections. Transmission can occur when respiratory droplets reach susceptible mucosal surfaces, such as in the eyes, nose or mouth. This can also happen indirectly via contact with contaminated surfaces when hands then touch the face. Before drying, respiratory droplets are large and cannot remain suspended in the air for long, and are usually dispersed over short distances. The size of the particles for droplet infections are > 5 μm.

Organisms spread by droplet transmission include respiratory viruses such as influenza virus, parainfluenza virus, adenoviruses, rhinovirus, respiratory syncytial virus, human metapneumovirus, Bordetella pertussis, pneumococci, streptococcus pyogenes, diphtheria, rubella, and coronaviruses. Spread of respiratory droplets from the wearer can be reduced through wearing of a surgical mask.

=== Direct contact ===
Direct contact occurs through skin-to-skin contact, kissing, and sexual intercourse. Direct contact also refers to contact with soil or vegetation harboring infectious organisms. Additionally, while fecal–oral transmission is primarily considered an indirect contact route, direct contact can also result in transmission through feces.

Diseases that can be transmitted by direct contact are called contagious (contagious is not the same as infectious; although all contagious diseases are infectious, not all infectious diseases are contagious). These diseases can also be transmitted by sharing a towel (where the towel is rubbed vigorously on both bodies) or items of clothing in close contact with the body (socks, for example) if they are not washed thoroughly between uses. For this reason, contagious diseases often break out in schools, where towels are shared and personal items of clothing accidentally swapped in the changing rooms.

Some diseases that are transmissible by direct contact include athlete's foot, impetigo, syphilis, warts, and conjunctivitis.

==== Sexual ====
This refers to any infection that can be caught during sexual activity with another person, including vaginal or anal sex, less commonly through oral sex (see below) and rarely through manual sex (see below). Transmission is either directly between surfaces in contact during intercourse (the usual route for bacterial infections and those infections causing sores) or from secretions (semen or the fluid secreted by the excited female) which carry infectious agents that get into the partner's blood stream through tiny tears in the penis, vagina or rectum (this is a more usual route for viruses). In this second case, anal sex is considerably more hazardous since the penis opens more tears in the rectum than the vagina, as the vagina is more elastic and more accommodating.

Some infections transmissible by the sexual route include HIV/AIDS, chlamydia, genital warts, gonorrhea, hepatitis B, syphilis, herpes, and trichomoniasis.

==== Oral sex ====
Sexually transmitted infections such as HIV and hepatitis B are thought to not normally be transmitted through mouth-to-mouth contact, although it is possible to transmit some STIs between the genitals and the mouth, during oral sex. In the case of HIV, this possibility has been established. It is also responsible for the increased incidence of herpes simplex virus 1 (which is usually responsible for oral infections) in genital infections and the increased incidence of the type 2 virus (more common genitally) in oral infections.

==== Manual sex ====
While rare in regards to this sexual practice, some infections that can spread via manual sex include HPV, chlamydia, and syphilis.

==== Oral ====
Infections that are transmitted primarily by oral means may be caught through direct oral contact such as kissing, or by indirect contact such as by sharing a drinking glass or a cigarette. Infections that are known to be transmissible by kissing or by other direct or indirect oral contact include all of the infections transmissible by droplet contact and (at least) all forms of herpes viruses, namely Cytomegalovirus infections herpes simplex virus (especially HSV-1) and infectious mononucleosis.

==== Mother-to-child transmission ====
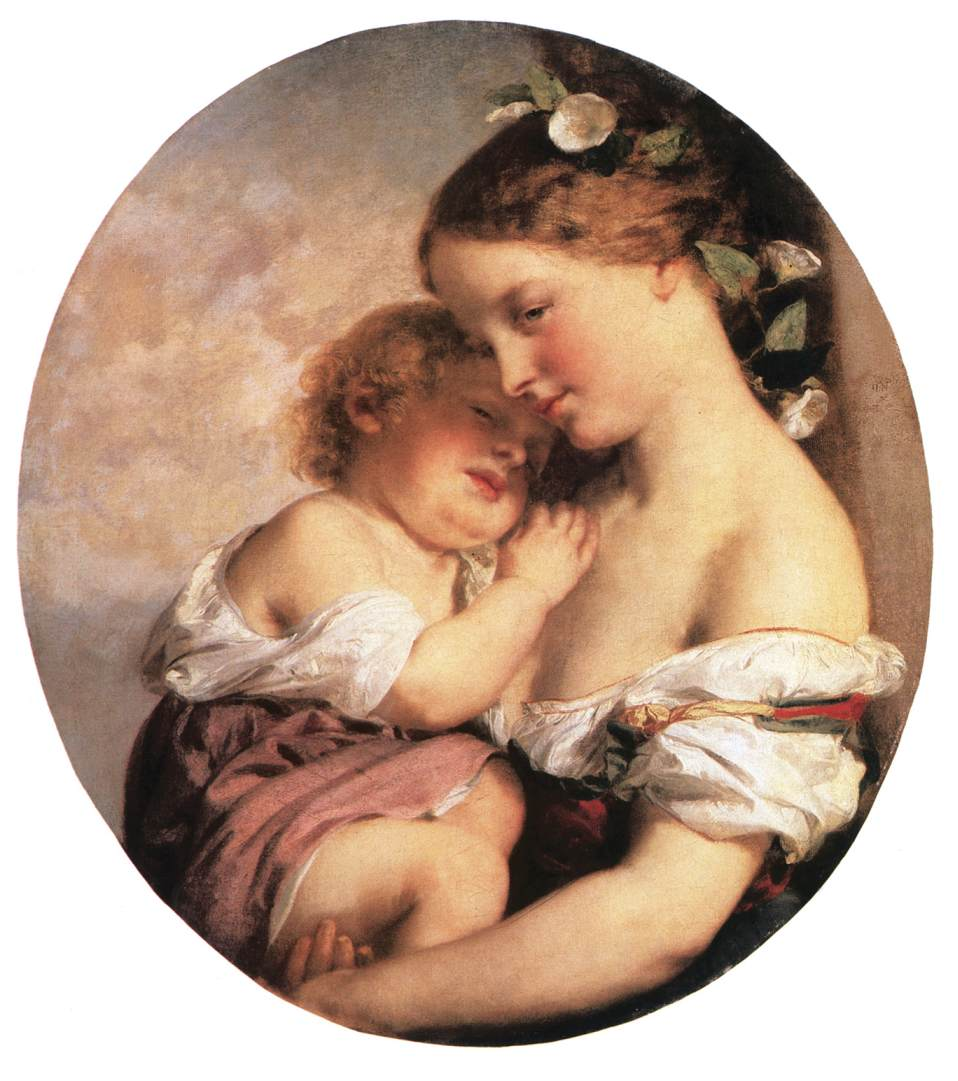
Brocky, Karoly - Mother and Child (1846–50)

This is from mother to child (more rarely father to child), often in utero, during childbirth (also referred to as perinatal infection) or during postnatal physical contact between parents and offspring. In mammals, including humans, it occurs also via breast milk (transmammary transmission). Infectious diseases that can be transmitted in this way include: HIV, hepatitis B and syphilis. Many mutualistic organisms are transmitted vertically.

==== Iatrogenic ====
Transmission due to medical procedures, such as touching a wound, the use of contaminated medical equipment, or an injection or transplantation of infected material. Some diseases that can be transmitted iatrogenically include Creutzfeldt–Jakob disease, HIV, and many more.

==== Needle sharing ====
This is the practice of intravenous drug-users by which a needle or syringe is shared by multiple individuals to administer intravenous drugs such as heroin, steroids, and hormones. This can act as a vector for blood-borne diseases, such as Hepatitis C (HCV) and HIV.

=== Indirect contact ===
Indirect contact transmission, also known as vehicle-borne transmission, involves transmission through contamination of inanimate objects. Vehicles that may indirectly transmit an infectious agent include food, water, biologic products such as blood, and fomites such as handkerchiefs, bedding, or surgical scalpels. A vehicle may passively carry a pathogen, as in the case of food or water may carrying hepatitis A virus. Alternatively, the vehicle may provide an environment in which the agent grows, multiplies, or produces toxin, such as improperly canned foods provide an environment that supports production of botulinum toxin by Clostridium botulinum.

=== Transmission by other organisms ===
A vector is an organism that does not cause disease itself but that transmits infection by conveying pathogens from one host to another.

Vectors may be mechanical or biological. A mechanical vector picks up an infectious agent on the outside of its body and transmits it in a passive manner. An example of a mechanical vector is a housefly, which lands on cow dung, contaminating its appendages with bacteria from the feces, and then lands on food prior to consumption. The pathogen never enters the body of the fly. In contrast, biological vectors harbor pathogens within their bodies and deliver pathogens to new hosts in an active manner, usually a bite. Biological vectors are often responsible for serious blood-borne diseases, such as malaria, viral encephalitis, Chagas disease, Lyme disease and African sleeping sickness. Biological vectors are usually, though not exclusively, arthropods, such as mosquitoes, ticks, fleas and lice. Vectors are often required in the life cycle of a pathogen. A common strategy used to control vector-borne infectious diseases is to interrupt the life cycle of a pathogen by killing the vector.

=== Fecal–oral ===
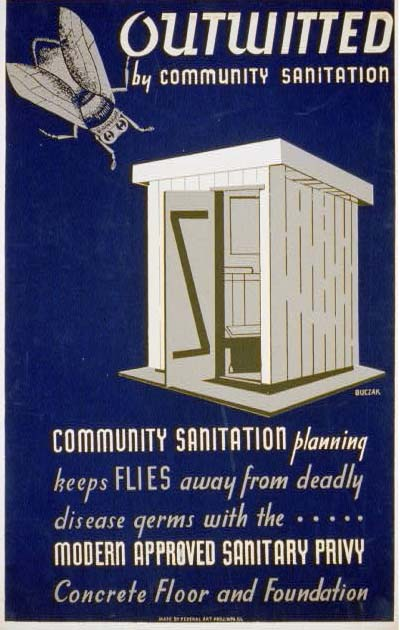
1940 US WPA poster encouraging modernized privies

In the fecal-oral route, pathogens in fecal particles pass from one person to the mouth of another person. Although it is usually discussed as a route of transmission, it is actually a specification of the entry and exit portals of the pathogen, and can operate across several of the other routes of transmission. Fecal–oral transmission is primarily considered as an indirect contact route through contaminated food or water. However, it can also operate through direct contact with feces or contaminated body parts, such as through anal sex. It can also operate through droplet or airborne transmission through the toilet plume from contaminated toilets.

Main causes of fecal–oral disease transmission include lack of adequate sanitation and poor hygiene practices - which can take various forms. Fecal oral transmission can be via foodstuffs or water that has become contaminated. This can happen when people do not adequately wash their hands after using the toilet and before preparing food or tending to patients.

The fecal-oral route of transmission can be a public health risk for people in developing countries who live in urban slums without access to adequate sanitation. Here, excreta or untreated sewage can pollute drinking water sources (groundwater or surface water). The people who drink the polluted water can become infected. Another problem in some developing countries is open defecation which leads to disease transmission via the fecal-oral route.

Even in developed countries there are periodic system failures resulting in a sanitary sewer overflow. This is the typical mode of transmission for infectious agents such as cholera, hepatitis A, polio, Rotavirus, Salmonella, and parasites (e.g. Ascaris lumbricoides).

== Tracking ==
Tracking the transmission of infectious diseases is called disease surveillance. Surveillance of infectious diseases in the public realm traditionally has been the responsibility of public health agencies, on an international, national, or local level. Public health staff relies on health care workers and microbiology laboratories to report cases of reportable diseases to them. The analysis of aggregate data can show the spread of a disease and is at the core of the specialty of epidemiology. To understand the spread of the vast majority of non-notifiable diseases, data either need to be collected in a particular study, or existing data collections can be mined, such as insurance company data or antimicrobial drug sales for example.

For diseases transmitted within an institution, such as a hospital, prison, nursing home, boarding school, orphanage, refugee camp, etc., infection control specialists are employed, who will review medical records to analyze transmission as part of a hospital epidemiology program, for example.

Because these traditional methods are slow, time-consuming, and labor-intensive, proxies of transmission have been sought. One proxy in the case of influenza is tracking of influenza-like illness at certain sentinel sites of health care practitioners within a state, for example. Tools have been developed to help track influenza epidemics by finding patterns in certain web search query activity. It was found that the frequency of influenza-related web searches as a whole rises as the number of people sick with influenza rises. Examining space-time relationships of web queries has been shown to approximate the spread of influenza and dengue.

Computer simulations of infectious disease spread have been used. Human aggregation can drive transmission, seasonal variation and outbreaks of infectious diseases, such as the annual start of school, bootcamp, the annual Hajj etc. Most recently, data from cell phones have been shown to be able to capture population movements well enough to predict the transmission of certain infectious diseases, like rubella.

== Relationship with virulence and survival ==
Pathogens must have a way to be transmitted from one host to another to ensure their species' survival. Infectious agents are generally specialized for a particular method of transmission. Taking an example from the respiratory route, from an evolutionary perspective viruses or bacteria that cause their host to develop coughing and sneezing symptoms have a great survival advantage, as they are much more likely to be ejected from one host and carried to another. This is also the reason that many microorganisms cause diarrhea.

The relationship between virulence and transmission is complex and has important consequences for the long term evolution of a pathogen. Since it takes many generations for a microbe and a new host species to co-evolve, an emerging pathogen may hit its earliest victims especially hard. It is usually in the first wave of a new disease that death rates are highest. If a disease is rapidly fatal, the host may die before the microbe can be passed along to another host. However, this cost may be overwhelmed by the short-term benefit of higher infectiousness if transmission is linked to virulence, as it is for instance in the case of cholera (the explosive diarrhea aids the bacterium in finding new hosts) or many respiratory infections (sneezing and coughing create infectious aerosols).

Anything that reduces the rate of transmission of an infection carries positive externalities, which are benefits to society that are not reflected in a price to a consumer. This is recognized implicitly when vaccines are offered for free or at a cost to the patient less than the purchase price.

== Beneficial microorganisms ==
The mode of transmission is also an important aspect of the biology of beneficial microbial symbionts, such as coral-associated dinoflagellates or human microbiota. Organisms can form symbioses with microbes transmitted from their parents, from the environment or unrelated individuals, or both.

=== Vertical transmission ===
Vertical transmission refers to acquisition of symbionts from parents (usually mothers). Vertical transmission can be intracellular (e.g. transovarial), or extracellular (for example through post-embryonic contact between parents and offspring). Both intracellular and extracellular vertical transmission can be considered a form of non-genetic inheritance or parental effect. It has been argued that most organisms experience some form of vertical transmission of symbionts. Canonical examples of vertically transmitted symbionts include the nutritional symbiont Buchnera in aphids (transovarially transmitted intracellular symbiont) and some components of the human microbiota (transmitted during passage of infants through the birth canal and also through breastfeeding).

=== Horizontal transmission ===
Some beneficial symbionts are acquired horizontally, from the environment or unrelated individuals. This requires that host and symbiont have some method of recognizing each other or each other's products or services. Often, horizontally acquired symbionts are relevant to secondary rather than primary metabolism, for example for use in defense against pathogens, but some primary nutritional symbionts are also horizontally (environmentally) acquired. Additional examples of horizontally transmitted beneficial symbionts include bioluminescent bacteria associated with bobtail squid and nitrogen-fixing bacteria in plants.

=== Mixed-mode transmission ===
Many microbial symbionts, including human microbiota, can be transmitted both vertically and horizontally. Mixed-mode transmission can allow symbionts to have the "best of both worlds" – they can vertically infect host offspring when host density is low, and horizontally infect diverse additional hosts when a number of additional hosts are available. Mixed-mode transmission make the outcome (degree of harm or benefit) of the relationship more difficult to predict, because the evolutionary success of the symbiont is sometimes but not always tied to the success of the host.

== See also ==
- Bioaerosol
- Bugchasing
- Cross-species transmission
- Infectious disease: Transmission
- Rodentology
- Transmission coefficient (epidemiology)
