= Celebrity Millennium =

Millennium-class cruise ship operated by Celebrity Cruises

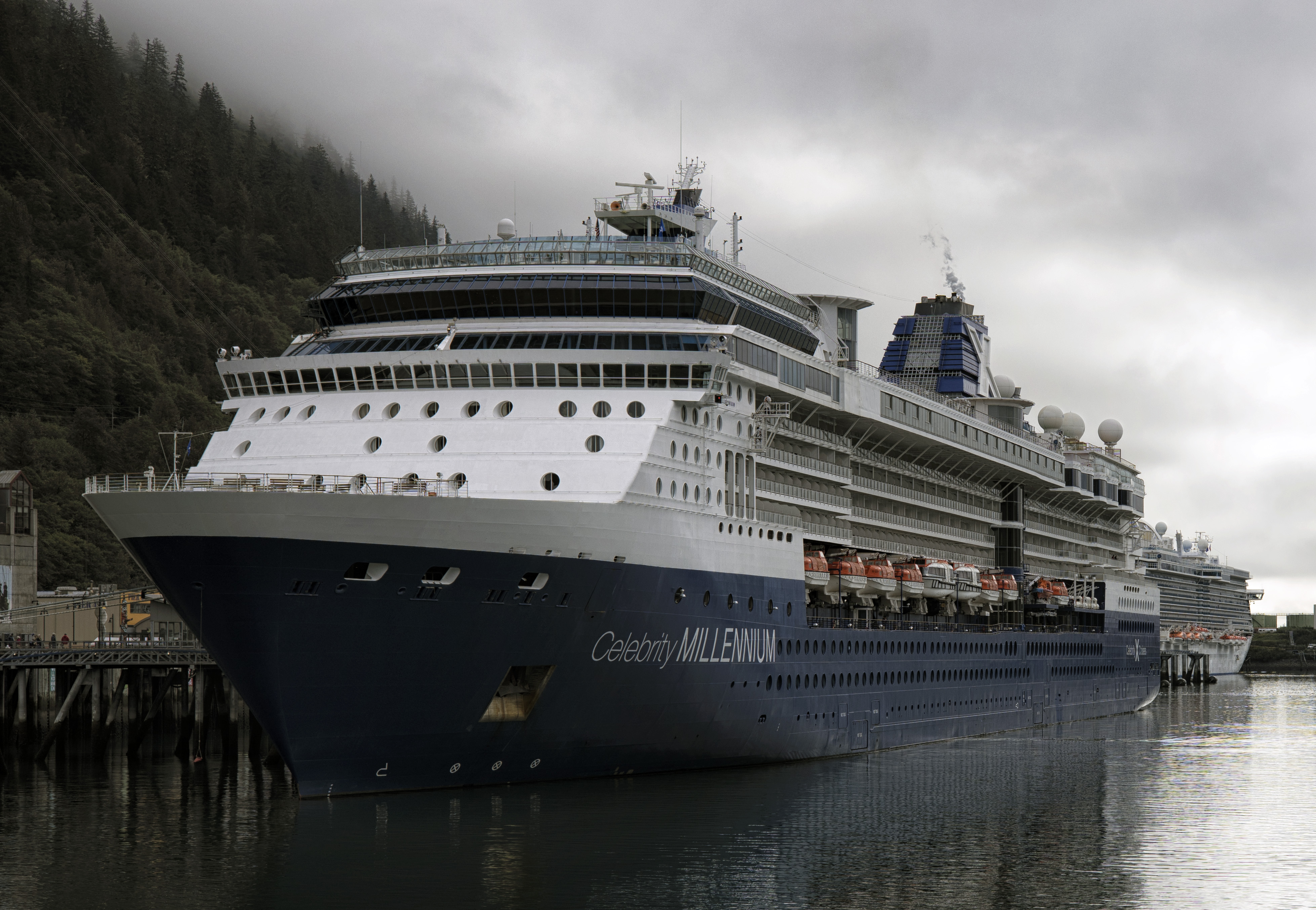
- Celebrity Millennium in Juneau, 2023

History

Malta
- Name: 2000–2007: Millennium; 2007–present: Celebrity Millennium
- Owner: Royal Caribbean Group
- Operator: Celebrity Cruises
- Port of registry: 2000–2002: Monrovia, Liberia; 2002–2007: Nassau, Bahamas; 2008–present: Valletta, Malta
- Builder: Chantiers de l'Atlantique; St. Nazaire, France
- Yard number: R31
- Launched: 7 November 1999
- Sponsored by: Robyn Roux
- Christened: 26 June 2000
- Acquired: 22 June 2000
- Maiden voyage: 1 July 2000
- In service: 2000–present
- Identification: Call sign: 9HJF9; IMO number: 9189419; MMSI number: 249055000
- Status: in Service

General characteristics
- Class & type: Millennium-class cruise ship
- Tonnage: 90,963 GT
- Length: 964.6 ft (294 m)
- Beam: 105.6 ft (32 m)
- Draught: 26 ft (8 m)
- Decks: 11 (passenger accessible)
- Installed power: Two General Electric gas turbines; 50,000 kW (combined)
- Propulsion: 2 × 19 MW Rolls-Royce/Alstom Mermaid azimuth thrusters
- Speed: 24 knots (44 km/h; 28 mph)
- Capacity: 2,138 passengers
- Crew: 920–999

GTS Celebrity Millennium (formerly Millennium) is a Millennium-class cruise ship operated by Celebrity Cruises, a subsidiary of Royal Caribbean Group. As the lead ship of her namesake class, all of whom are powered by gas turbines, she was delivered in 2000 and is the oldest operating ship in Celebrity's fleet.

== History ==
=== Planning and construction ===
In February 1998, Royal Caribbean signed a letter of intent with Chantiers de l'Atlantique to build two new ships, with an option for two more, that would make up a new class of ships, dubbed the Millennium class. Designed to be an evolution from Celebrity's Century-class ships, these new ships were originally planned to measure 85,000 GT and have a guest capacity of approximately 1,900, and be delivered in June 2000 and January 2001, respectively.

The ship was the first new-build vessel for Celebrity following the merger between it and Royal Caribbean, and also Celebrity's first new-build not built by German shipyard Meyer Werft. She was launched on 7 November 1999 from the shipyard. She set out for her first set of sea trials on 7 April 2000 and her second set on 21 April 2000. She was initially scheduled to be delivered on 31 May 2000, but her delivery was delayed to 22 June 2000. She was christened in Southampton on 26 June 2000 by Robyn Roux, wife of French celebrity chef Michel Roux. Her first port of registry was Monrovia, Liberia.

=== Operational career ===
Following her christening, Millennium sailed her maiden voyage on 1 July 2000 from Amsterdam to Baltic ports. Following an inaugural Europe season, she debuted in North America in New York in November 2000 before re-positioning in December to Port Everglades in Fort Lauderdale, Florida to sail cruises in the Caribbean through the winter. She sailed in the Mediterranean the following summer. Since 2001, the ship has sailed extensively throughout Europe, Australasia, and the Caribbean.

In May 2011, a female passenger in her sixties was declared missing when she failed to disembark at a port call in San Diego. Security cameras on the ship showed that she had jumped off the ship into the waters between Cabo San Lucas and San Diego.

In December 2012, the ship debuted in Asia after arriving at her homeport of Singapore, where the ship has been primarily deployed through the winter; in the summer, she has primarily sailed in Alaska.

Because of the COVID-19 pandemic, in February 2020, Celebrity cancelled all Asia cruises on Celebrity Millennium and re-deployed her to Los Angeles to sail complimentary cruises in March and April 2020 for first responders and military personnel. However, all sailings were cancelled after the company halted operations on 13 March 2020. The ship was berthed or anchored offshore near San Diego throughout much of the pandemic; after months of difficulty repatriating crew members, up to 480 crew members still remained on board the ship in May 2020.

In summer 2021, Celebrity Millennium joined Celebrity Edge in becoming the second ship in its fleet to re-start North American Operations, offering few sailings out of St. Maarten prior to being repositioned to Seattle where in July 23 she became the 2nd ship worldwide to resume Alaska sailings.

== Design and specifications ==
Millennium's original hull livery featured a predominantly dark blue paint with yellow and white bands lining the vessel. Upon delivery, she became the world's first cruise ship to use a turbo-electric COGES power plant. The COGES plant consists of gas and steam turbines, with the latter being driven by steam generated using the heat from the exhaust of the gas turbines. In this way, some of the otherwise lost energy is reclaimed and the specific fuel consumption of the plant is decreased. Propulsion is provided by two "Mermaid" azimuth pod-propulsion units from Kamewa and Cegelec (now Alstom).

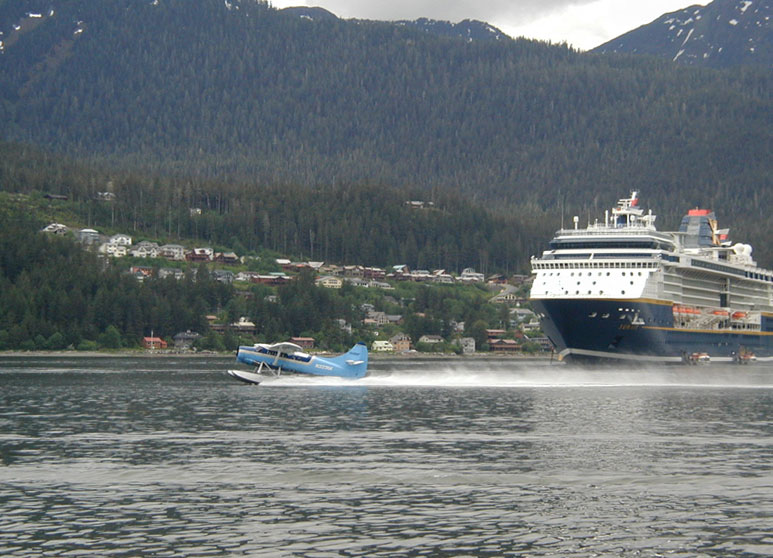
Celebrity Millenium in her original livery

The ship was also built featuring the Olympic Restaurant, a specialty restaurant that contained walnut wood panels that were used on RMS Olympic (sister ship to RMS Titanic and HMHS Britannic) and removed and preserved when the ship was sold for scrap in 1935. The ship also featured the first Music Library at sea, Notes, along with the first ocean view glass elevators on a cruise ship.

In early 2019, the ship was refurbished during a 35-day dry dock in Singapore at the Sembcorp Marine shipyard in Sembawang. Among the changes were 30 new passenger cabins.

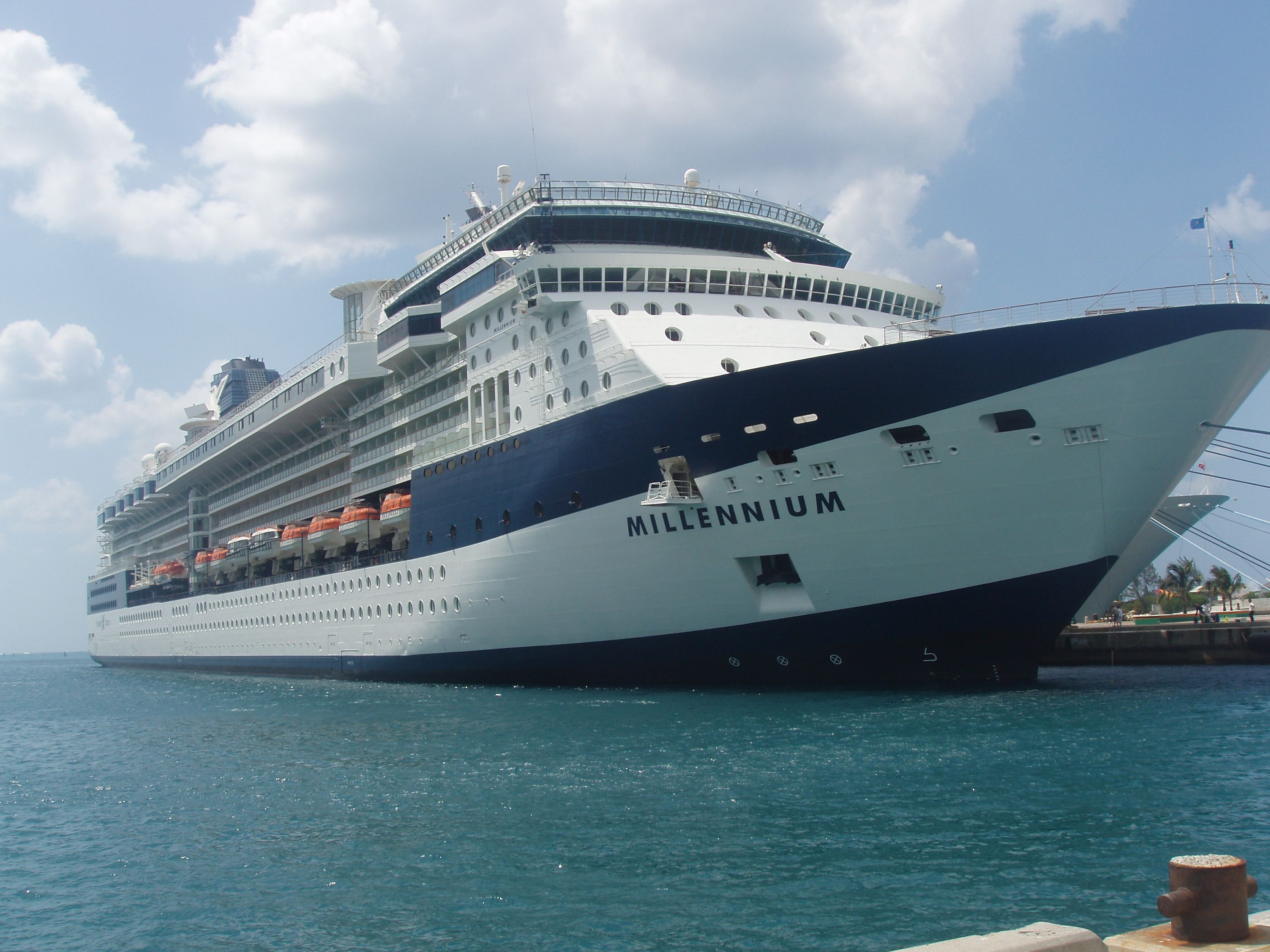
Millennium in second generation livery

=== Recurring pod propulsion issues ===
Months following her delivery, Millennium encountered problems with the bearings of her pod-propulsion system, which resulted in cancelled sailings for an emergency dry dock in December 2000 for repairs in Newport News Shipbuilding in Newport News, Virginia. In July 2007, the ship's propellers were damaged after striking a submerged rock during an electrical malfunction near Villefranche-sur-Mer, forcing the cancellation of numerous Mediterranean sailings. The damage was expected to negatively impact the earnings of Royal Caribbean by approximately $0.14 per share. In August 2013, the ship encountered problems with the electrical parts of the pods' motors that caused the cancellation of her remaining Alaskan sailings and forced an emergency dry dock for repairs in September 2013. The problem reportedly cost Celebrity approximately $13 million in lost ticket revenue and an estimated total of $31 million with all incurred expenses combined.

Numerous repairs that proved unsuccessful led Royal Caribbean to file a lawsuit against Rolls-Royce and Alstom in August 2003 for $300 million to recover lost revenue and the costs associated with the pods. Royal Caribbean later settled the lawsuit in January 2010.
