= Combined gas and steam =

Marine propulsion system

Combined gas and steam (COGAS) is a type of marine propulsion system comprising gas and steam turbines, the latter being driven by steam generated using the heat from the exhaust of the gas turbines.

== System ==
Combined marine propulsion
Combined diesel or gas	(CODOG)
Combined diesel and gas	(CODAG)
Combined diesel–electric and diesel	(CODLAD)
Combined diesel–electric and gas	(CODLAG)
Combined diesel and diesel	(CODAD)
Combined steam and gas	(COSAG)
Combined gas or gas	(COGOG)
Combined gas and gas	(COGAG)
Combined gas and steam	(COGAS)
Combined nuclear and steam	(CONAS)
Integrated electric propulsion	(IEP or IFEP)

A COGES system: 1. Electric generators; 2. Steam turbine; 3. Condenser; 4. Pump; 5. Boiler / heat exchanger; 6. Gas turbine

In this way, some of the otherwise lost energy can be reclaimed and the specific fuel consumption of the plant can be decreased. Large (land-based) electric powerplants built using this combined cycle can reach conversion efficiencies of over 60%.

If the turbines do not drive a propeller shaft directly and instead a turbine–electric transmission is used, the system is known as COGES (combined gas–electric and steam).

COGAS differs from many other combined marine propulsion systems in that it is not intended to operate on one system alone. While this is possible, it will not operate efficiently this way, as with combined diesel and gas (CODAG) systems when run solely on diesel engines. Especially COGAS should not be confused with combined steam and gas (COSAG) powerplants, which employ traditional, oil-fired boilers for steam turbine propulsion for normal cruising, and supplement this with gas turbines for faster reaction times and higher dash speed.

COGAS has been proposed as upgrade for ships that use gas turbines as their main (or only) engines, e.g. in COGOG or COGAG mode, such as the Arleigh Burke-class destroyers, but currently no naval ship uses this concept. However some modern cruise ships are equipped with COGES. E.g. the Celebrity Cruises' Millennium class use turbine–electric powerplants with two General Electric LM2500+ gas turbines and one steam turbine.

BMW is currently researching combined gas and steam for automotive use, using their turbosteamer system. This uses the waste heat of combustion from the exhaust and turns it into steam to produce torque which is input into the crankshaft.

== See also ==
- Cogeneration
- Combined cycle
- Combined-cycle power plant
- Combined cycle powered railway locomotive
