= Millennium-class cruise ship =

Class of cruise ships belonging to Celebrity Cruises

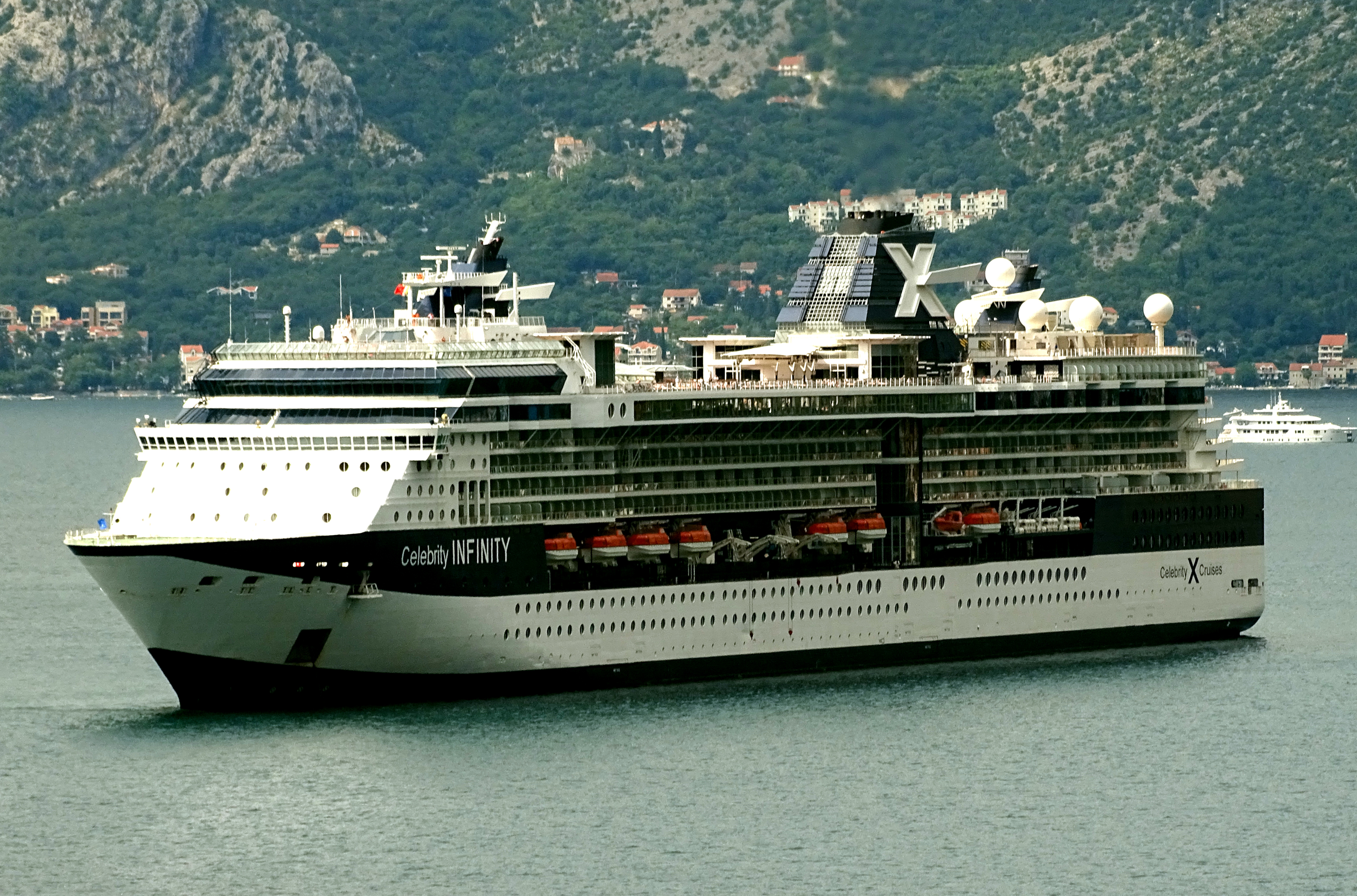
- Celebrity Infinity

Class overview
- Name: Millennium
- Builders: Chantiers de l'Atlantique
- Operators: Celebrity Cruises
- Preceded by: Century class
- Succeeded by: Solstice class
- Built: 1999–2002
- In service: 2000–present
- Planned: 4
- Completed: 4
- Active: 4

General characteristics
- Type: Cruise ship
- Tonnage: 90,280 GT
- Length: 294 m (964 ft 7 in)
- Beam: 32 m (105 ft 0 in)
- Draft: 8 m (26 ft 3 in)
- Decks: 12 decks
- Installed power: Two General Electric gas turbines 50,000 kW (67,000 hp) (combined)
- Propulsion: 2 × 19 MW (25,000 hp) Rolls-Royce/Alstom Mermaid azimuth thrusters
- Speed: 24 knots (44 km/h; 28 mph)
- Boats & landing craft carried: 20 lifeboats
- Capacity: 2,138 passengers
- Crew: 999 crews

The Millennium class is a class of four cruise ships of Celebrity Cruises. The ships were built between 1999 and 2002 at Chantiers de l'Atlantique in Saint-Nazaire.

== Ships ==
Ship	Entered service for Celebrity	Gross tonnage	Flag	Notes	Image
Celebrity Millennium	2000	91,011	Malta	Previously known as Millennium (2000–2008)	
Celebrity Infinity	2001	90,280	Malta	Previously known as Infinity (2001–2007)	
Celebrity Summit	2001	91,003	Malta	Previously known as Summit (2001–2008)	
Celebrity Constellation	2002	90,940	Malta	Previously known as Constellation (2002–2007)	
