= Celebrity Summit =

Millennium-class cruise ship

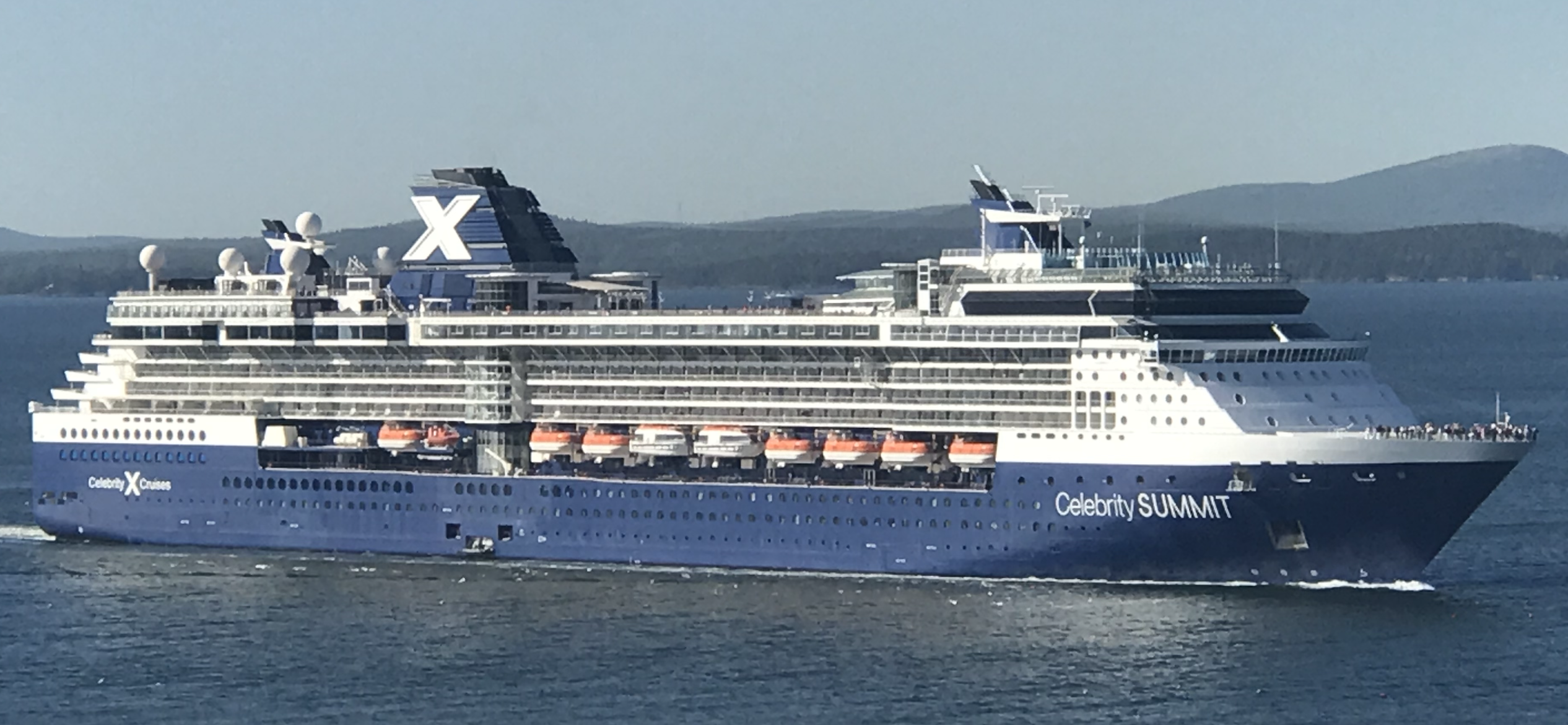
- Celebrity Summit departing Bar Harbor in June 2019.

History
- Name: Celebrity Summit (2008–present); Summit (2001–2008)
- Owner: Celebrity Cruises
- Operator: Celebrity Cruises
- Port of registry: Malta, Valletta (2009–present); Bahamas, Nassau (2002–2009); Liberia, Monrovia (2001–2002)
- Builder: Chantiers de l'Atlantique; St. Nazaire, France
- Cost: US$350 million
- Yard number: T31
- Launched: 9 March 2001
- Acquired: October 2001
- In service: November 2001
- Identification: Call sign: 9HJC9; IMO number: 9192387; MMSI number: 249047000
- Status: Active

General characteristics
- Class & type: Millennium-class cruise ship
- Tonnage: 90,940 GT; 53,268 NT; 11,788 DWT
- Length: 294 m (964 ft 7 in)
- Beam: 32.00 m (105 ft 0 in)
- Draught: 8 m (26 ft 3 in)
- Decks: 11 (passenger accessible)
- Installed power: 2 × General Electric gas turbines; 50,000 kW (combined)
- Propulsion: Two Rolls-Royce Mermaid azimuth thrusters
- Speed: 24 knots (44 km/h; 28 mph)
- Capacity: 2,158 passengers (lower berths); 2,218 passengers (all berths)
- Crew: 999

GTS Celebrity Summit is a Millennium-class cruise ship owned and operated by Celebrity Cruises and as such one of the first cruise ships to be powered by more environmentally friendly gas turbines. Originally named Summit, she was renamed with the "Celebrity" prefix in 2008.

== Construction ==
She was built in 2001 by the Chantiers de l'Atlantique shipyard in St. Nazaire, France for Celebrity Cruises.

== Design ==
=== Machinery ===
She is fitted with two General Electric LM2500+ gas turbines and is fitted with two Rolls-Royce Mermaid azimuthing electric pod propulsion units. These pods proved unreliable early in the ships career, however with upgrades and operational experience they are currently more reliable. She also has three bow thrusters.

=== Layout ===
As per the practice with the other ships of her class she included a remembrance in one of her restaurants to a historic early liner in the form of several panels and a bronze statue from the Compagnie Générale Transatlantique ship Normandie. The statue, which was named La Normandie, had been purchased by Celebrity Cruises from the Miami Beach-based Fontainebleau Miami Beach Hotel. The statue has since been removed from the main dining room during the ship's refurbishment in March 2019.

In 2012 she was refitted at a cost of US$16 million which included the creation of extra cabins. This increased her double occupancy to 2,158 passengers and her gross tonnage to 90,940.

Celebrity Summit spent approximately three weeks in dry dock followed by time in the shipyard in March 2019 having all of her existing cabins and suites refurbished as well as the addition of 30 new cabins which will bring her total capacity to 2,218 (double occupancy).

== Operation ==
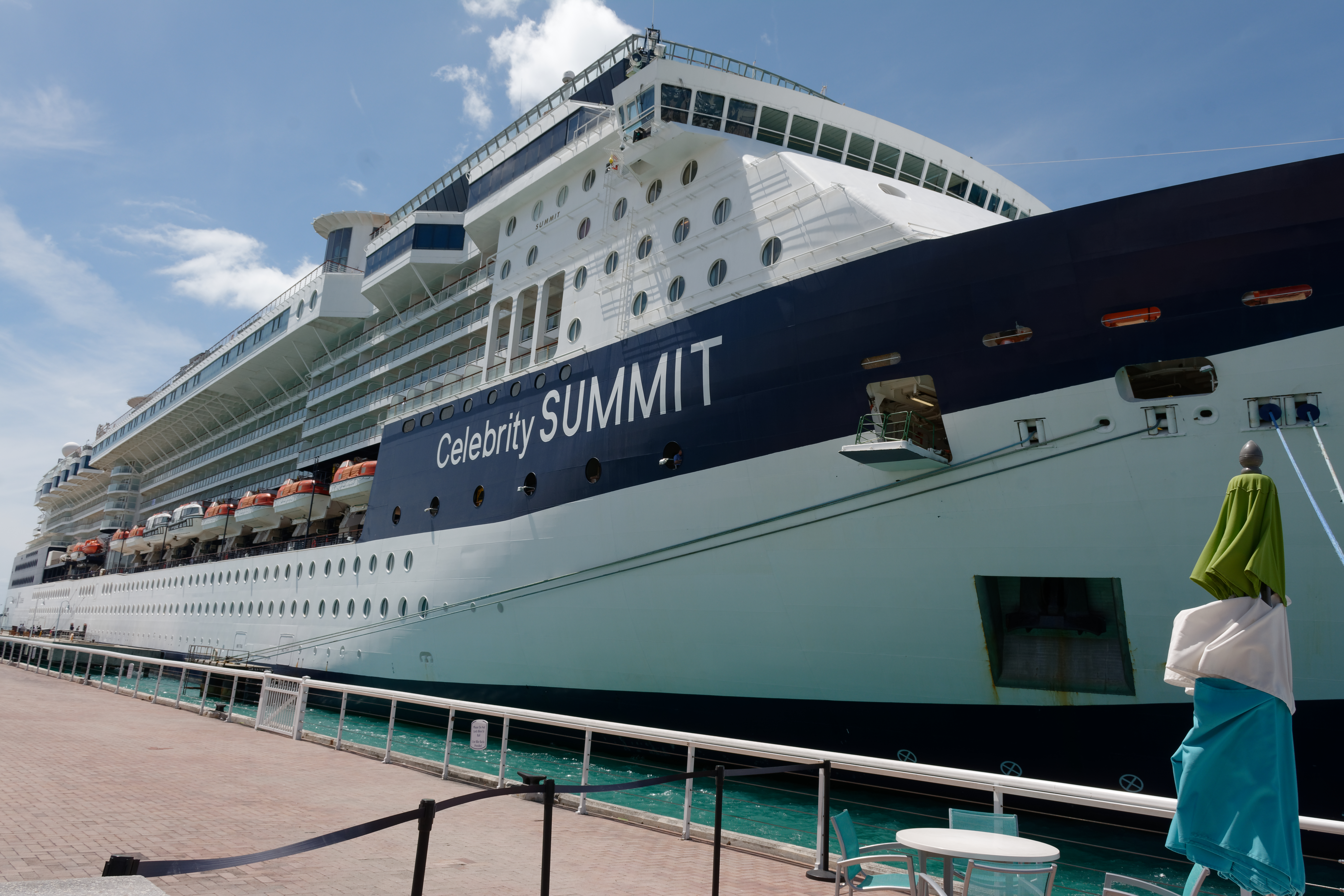
Docked in Key West in 2017

In the summer of 2006 Summit arrived in Seward, Alaska with a humpback whale dead on her bow.

On 3 April 2010, passenger Bob Gricius fell overboard and swam for 17 hours to Cayo Lobos, three miles (4.8 km) off the coast of Fajardo, Puerto Rico.

In March 2017, Celebrity Summit had an unscheduled dry dock because of a propulsion issue. One cruise was canceled and another one was shortened.

Celebrity Summit currently undertakes cruises from Bayonne, New Jersey or San Juan to destinations in Bermuda and the Caribbean. Additionally, other services on the Celebrity Summit start from Vancouver, Canada and has destinations to Seward, Alaska and San Pedro, California. It also sails from Seward, Alaska to Vancouver, Canada. Celebrity Summit has future plans to sail from Miami, Florida to destinations in Mexico and the Bahamas.

== See also ==
- Kate McCue, Captain of Celebrity Summit 2015–2018
